= Outline of the United Kingdom =

Country in Europe with dependencies and territories

Flag of the United Kingdom

The location of the United Kingdom

The following outline is provided as an overview of and topical guide to the United Kingdom:

United Kingdom of Great Britain and Northern Ireland is a sovereign country in Europe, commonly known as the United Kingdom (UK), or Britain. Lying off the north-western coast of the European mainland, it includes the island of Great Britain—a term also applied loosely to refer to the whole country—the north-eastern part of the island of Ireland and many smaller islands.

The United Kingdom of Great Britain and Northern Ireland is made up of four countries – England, Scotland, Northern Ireland and Wales, with Scotland, Northern Ireland and Wales each having their own devolved government and national parliament.

== General reference ==
- The United Kingdom is...
  - both a country and a country made up of countries
  - both a nation state and a state made up of nations
  - an island country
  - a Commonwealth realm (1931–)
  - a member state of NATO (1949–)
- Pronunciation: /juːˌnaɪtɪd ˈkɪŋdəm/
- Abbreviations: UK, GB, UKGBNI
- Common English country names: the UK, Britain, Great Britain, Great Britain and Northern Ireland, Albion (historical)
- Official English country name: the United Kingdom of Great Britain and Northern Ireland
- Common endonyms: United Kingdom, UK, Britain
- Official endonyms: the United Kingdom, the United Kingdom of Great Britain and Northern Ireland
- Adjectivals: British, United Kingdom
- Demonyms: Briton, British, Brit
- Etymology: Name of Britain, Name of the United Kingdom
  - Name of England
  - Name of Northern Ireland
  - Name of Scotland
  - Name of Wales
- International rankings of the United Kingdom
- Official languages: English
- Terminology of the British Isles
- United Kingdom-related topics
  - England-related topics
  - Scotland-related topics
  - Wales-related topics
  - Northern Ireland-related topics
- ISO country codes: GB, GBR, 826
- ISO region codes: See ISO 3166-2:GB
- Internet country code top-level domain: .uk, .gb (not used)

== Countries of the United Kingdom, Dependencies, Territories and Commonwealth ==
The four countries of the United KingdomScotland (orange) England (yellow) Wales (pink) Northern Ireland (purple)

=== Countries of the UK and their subdivisions ===
- England
  - Subdivisions of England
    - Regions of England
      - Counties of England (see also Metropolitan county and Shire county)
      - Unitary authorities of England
      - Districts of England (see also Metropolitan district and Shire district)
      - Civil parishes
    - Greater London
      - London boroughs
- Northern Ireland
  - Counties of Northern Ireland
  - Local government in Northern Ireland
    - Districts of Northern Ireland
- Scotland
  - Subdivisions of Scotland
    - Counties of Scotland
    - Shires of Scotland, 33 historical, geographical or cultural regions that have no administrative function, but remain historical legacies and the means of cultural identification
    - Local government in Scotland
    - Lieutenancy areas of Scotland
- Wales
  - Subdivisions of Wales
    - Principal areas of Wales
      - Communities
    - Preserved counties of Wales
    - Historic counties of Wales, 13 historical, geographical or cultural regions that have no administrative function, but remain historical legacies and the means of cultural identification

=== Crown Dependencies ===
Map of the British Crown Dependencies

Crown Dependencies

- Isle of Man
- Channel Islands
  - Jersey
  - Guernsey
  - Alderney
  - Sark

=== British Overseas Territories ===
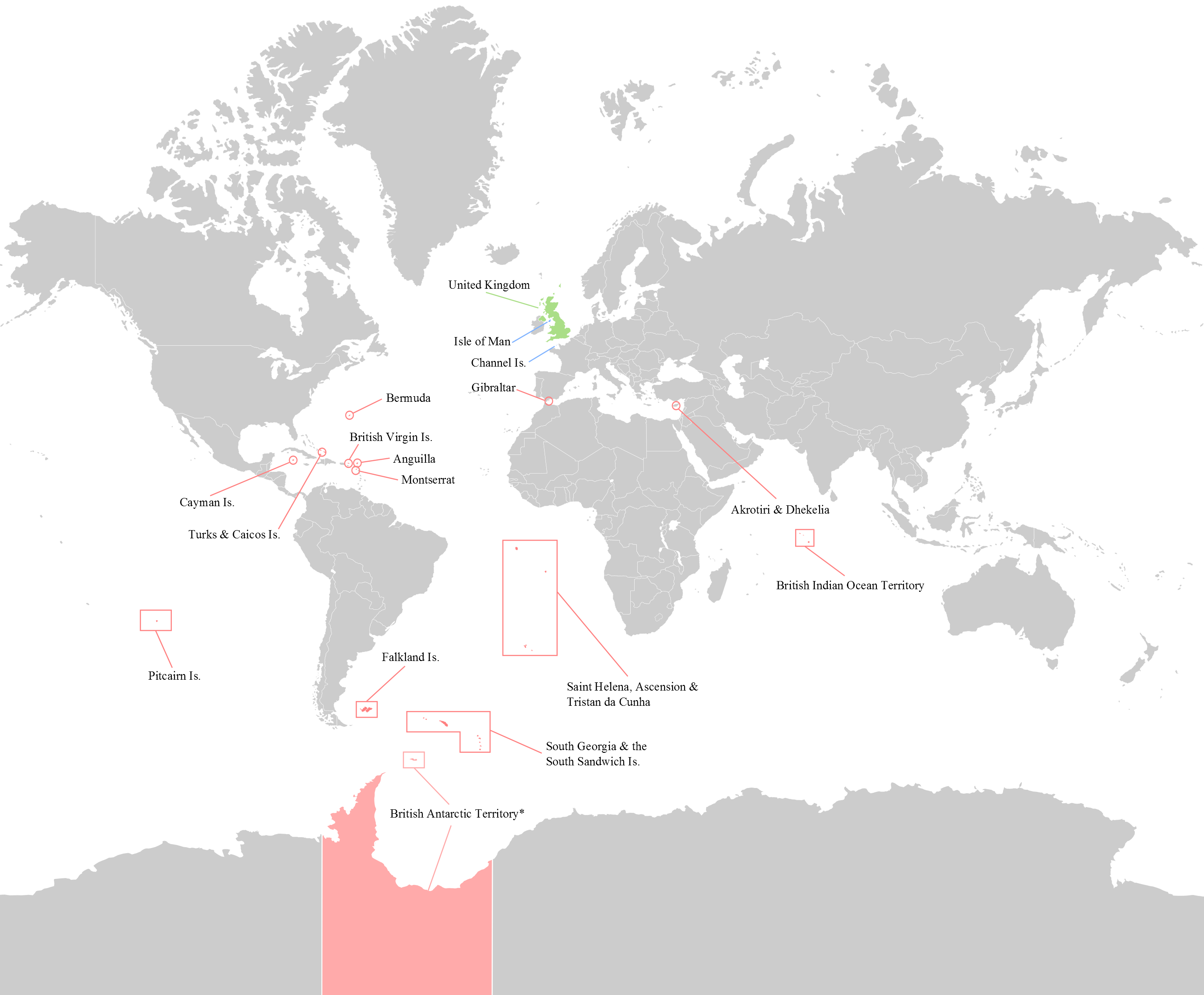
British Overseas Territories

British Overseas Territories

- Anguilla
- Bermuda
- British Antarctic Territory
- British Indian Ocean Territory
- British Virgin Islands
- Cayman Islands
- Falkland Islands
- Gibraltar
- Montserrat
- Pitcairn Islands
- Saint Helena, Ascension and Tristan da Cunha
- South Georgia and the South Sandwich Islands
- Sovereign Base Areas of Akrotiri and Dhekelia in Cyprus
- Turks and Caicos Islands

=== Commonwealth of Nations ===
Member states of the Commonwealth of Nations

The United Kingdom is a member state of the Commonwealth of Nations

- Member states of the Commonwealth of Nations
  - Commonwealth realm
- Commonwealth citizen
  - Head of the Commonwealth
- Commonwealth War Graves Commission (1917-)
- Commonwealth Games (1930-)

== Geography, resources and demography ==
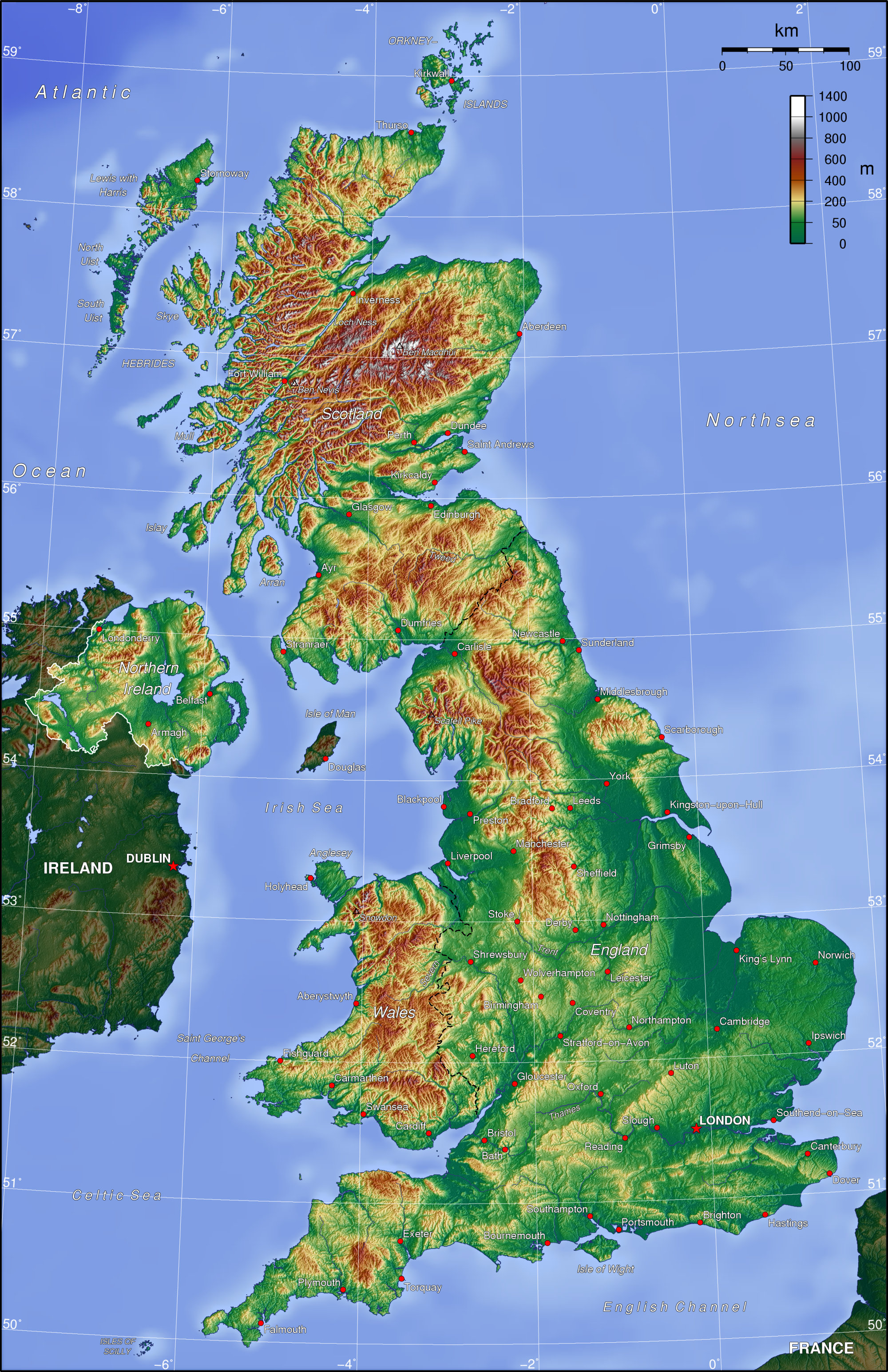
Topographic map of the United Kingdom

Geography of the United Kingdom

- Location:
  - Northern Hemisphere, on the prime meridian
  - Atlantic Ocean
  - Eurasia (but not on the mainland)
    - Europe
      - Northern Europe and Western Europe
        - British Isles
          - Great Britain (entire island and adjacent isles)
          - Ireland (northeastern sixth of the island)
  - Time zone: Greenwich Mean Time = Western European Time (UTC+00), British Summer Time = Western European Summer Time (UTC+01)
- Area of the United Kingdom: 244,820 km^{2} (94,530 sq mi) – 79th most extensive country
  - Area of the countries of the United Kingdom
- Extreme points of the United Kingdom:
  - North: Out Stack, Shetland Islands 60°51′N 0°52′W
  - South: Western Rocks, Isles of Scilly 49°51′N 6°24′W
  - East: Lowestoft Ness, Suffolk 52°28.87′N 1°45.77′E
  - West: Rockall^{1} 57°35′N 13°41′W
  - High: Ben Nevis, Lochaber at 1,343 m (4,406 ft) 56°47′49.150″N 5°0′17.22″W
    - Low: The Fens at −4 m (−13 ft) 52.48838°N 0.23118°W
  - Land boundaries: Republic of Ireland 360 km
  - Land boundary: France undersea in Channel Tunnel
  - Coastline: 12,429 km
- Atlas of the United Kingdom
  - Atlas of England
  - Atlas of Northern Ireland
  - Atlas of Scotland
  - Atlas of Wales
  - Economic geography of the United Kingdom

=== Ecoregions ===
List of ecoregions in the United Kingdom

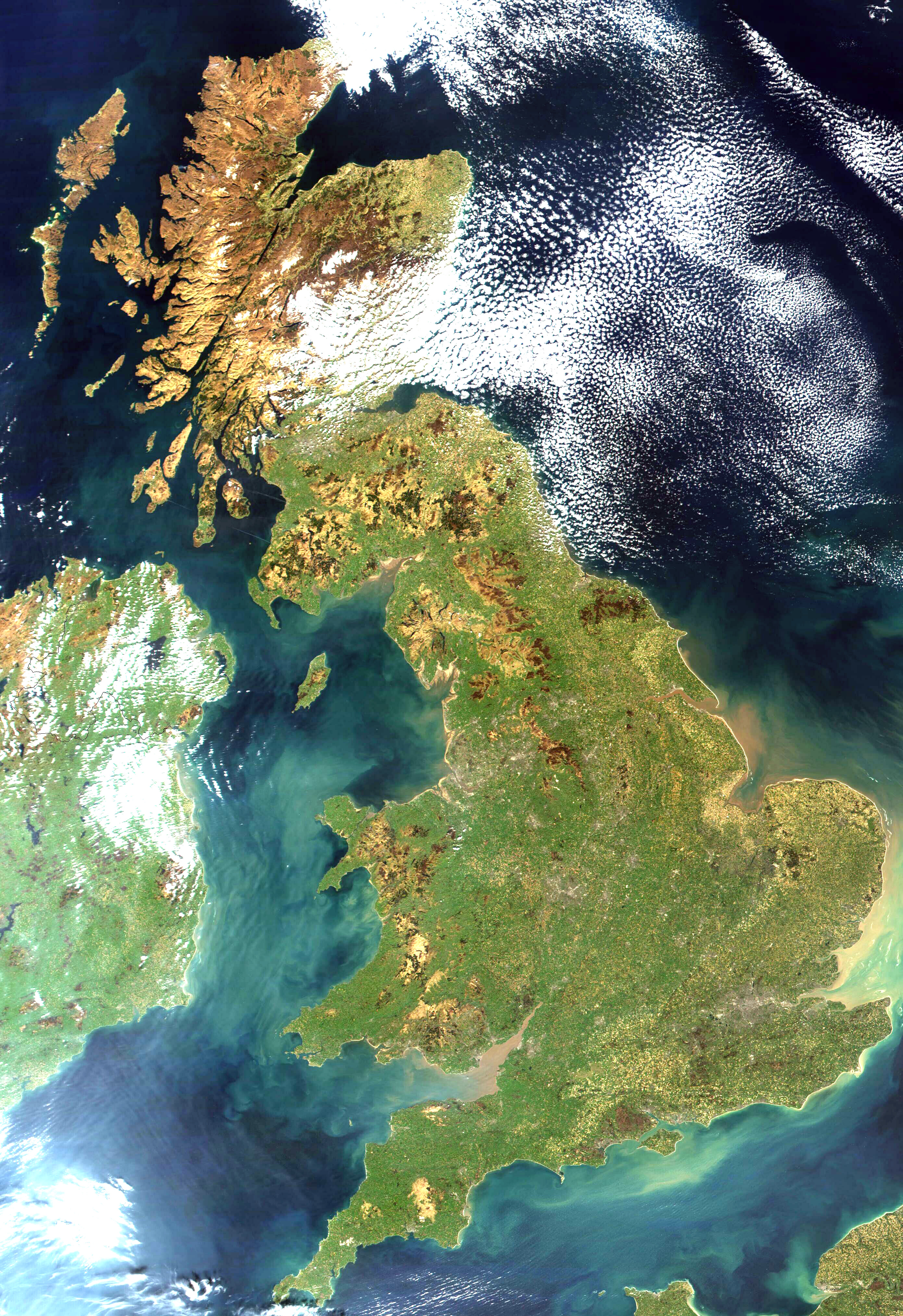
Satellite image of the United Kingdom

=== Environment ===
- Climate of the United Kingdom
  - Climate of Scotland
  - Climate of Wales
- Environmental issues in the United Kingdom
- Conservation in the United Kingdom
- Energy in the United Kingdom
- Green building in the United Kingdom
- Ecoregions in the United Kingdom
- Renewable energy in the United Kingdom
  - Green electricity in the United Kingdom
    - Hydroelectricity in the United Kingdom
    - Wind power in the United Kingdom
    - Solar power in the United Kingdom
- Geology of Great Britain
  - Earthquakes in the British Isles
- National parks of the United Kingdom
  - National parks of the United Kingdom
  - National parks of Wales
  - National parks of Scotland
- Protected areas of the United Kingdom
  - Environmentally sensitive area (ESA)
  - Heritage coast
  - Scenic areas
    - National Landscape (formerly Area of Outstanding Natural Beauty, AONB) – England and Wales
      - National Landscapes in Wales – Wales
    - National scenic area – Scotland
    - Area of Outstanding Natural Beauty (Northern Ireland)
  - Scheduled monument
  - Site of Special Scientific Interest (SSSI)
  - Special Area of Conservation (SAC) (European Union)
  - Special Protection Area (SPA) (European Union)
  - Wetlands designated under the Ramsar Convention (International)
- Wildlife of the United Kingdom
  - Flora of the United Kingdom
    - Trees of Britain and Ireland
    - List of the vascular plants of Britain and Ireland
  - Fauna of the United Kingdom
    - List of mammals of the United Kingdom
    - Birds of the United Kingdom
      - List of birds of Great Britain
      - List of birds of Wales
    - List of reptiles of Great Britain
    - List of amphibians of Great Britain
    - List of fishes of Great Britain
    - Lists of insects of Great Britain
- Climate of the United Kingdom
  - United Kingdom Climate Change Programme
  - List of UK extreme rainfall amounts
- Conservation in the United Kingdom
- Environmentally sensitive area
  - Green belts
  - Notable trees in Great Britain
  - National nature reserve
  - National Trust for Places of Historic Interest or Natural Beauty
  - Special Protection Area
    - Site of Special Scientific Interest
- List of waterfalls of the United Kingdom
- List of natural disasters in the United Kingdom
  - The Great Storm of 1987

=== Geographic features ===
- Coastline
- Islands
- Lakes
- Lochs
- Mountains and hills
  - Volcanoes
- Rivers
  - Waterfalls
- World Heritage Sites

=== Regions ===
Fourteen areas are designated as national parks in the United Kingdom; in addition, The Broads (seen in light green, in the East) now have 'equivalent status'

- Time zone of the UK

==== Municipalities ====
- Cities
  - Capital of the United Kingdom: London
  - Second city of the United Kingdom
  - Cities by population
- Towns:
  - Towns in England
  - Burghs in Scotland
  - Towns in Wales
  - Towns in Northern Ireland
- City status in the United Kingdom
- Conurbations
- Green belt

=== Natural Resources ===
- Energy in the United Kingdom inc. Renewable energy in the United Kingdom
  - Biodiesel in the United Kingdom
  - Coal mining in the United Kingdom
  - Geothermal power in the United Kingdom
  - Hydraulic fracturing in the United Kingdom
  - Hydroelectricity in the United Kingdom
  - Marine energy in the United Kingdom
  - North Sea oil
  - Solar power in the United Kingdom
  - Wind power in the United Kingdom
- Food
  - Agriculture in the United Kingdom
  - Fishing industry in England
  - Fishing in Scotland
  - Fishing industry in Wales
  - Hunting and shooting in the United Kingdom
- Materials
  - Forestry in the United Kingdom
  - Mining in the United Kingdom
- List of renewable resources produced and traded by the United Kingdom

Map of population density in the UK as at the 2011 census

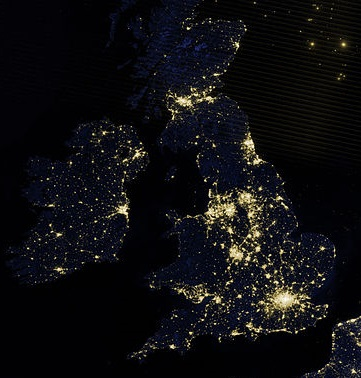
NASA VIIRS image highlighting UK population centres

Population density (people per km^{2}) by country, 2015

=== Demography ===
Demographics of the United Kingdom

- Population of the United Kingdom: 64,105,700 (2013 estimate) making it the 22nd most populous country and, with a population density of 259/km^{2} (679/sq.mile), ranking it 51st on the List of sovereign states and dependent territories by population density. This is largely due to the particularly high population density of England which measures 406/km^{2}.
  - Population of the countries of the United Kingdom
  - UK birth and deaths since 1960
  - Immigration to the United Kingdom

=== Ethnicity ===
Ethnic groups in the United Kingdom

- Commission for Racial Equality
- British
- White British
  - English
  - Scottish
  - Welsh
  - Northern Irish
  - Ulster-Scot
  - Cornish
- White Irish
- Other White Ethnic Groups
  - Western European
    - French migration to the United Kingdom
    - Dutch people in the United Kingdom
    - Italians in the United Kingdom
    - Germans in the United Kingdom
    - Spaniards in the United Kingdom
    - Portuguese in the United Kingdom
    - Scandinavian migration to Britain
  - Eastern European
    - Poles in the United Kingdom
    - Baltic people in the United Kingdom
    - Lithuanians in the United Kingdom
    - Czechs in the United Kingdom
    - Hungarians in the United Kingdom
    - Greeks in the United Kingdom
    - Serbs in the United Kingdom
    - Romanians in the United Kingdom
    - Bulgarians in the United Kingdom
    - British Cypriots
  - North American
    - Americans in the United Kingdom
    - Canadians in the United Kingdom
    - Australians in the United Kingdom
  - Other
    - British Jews
    - Irish Travellers
    - Roma
    - New age travellers
- British Asian
  - British Indian
  - British Pakistanis
  - British Bangladeshi
  - British Sri Lankans
- Oriental British
  - British Chinese
  - Filipinos in the United Kingdom
  - Japanese in the United Kingdom
  - British Koreans
  - Thais in the United Kingdom
  - Malaysians in the United Kingdom
  - Singaporeans in the United Kingdom
- British Arabs
  - Yemenis in the United Kingdom
  - British Iraqis
  - Armenians in the United Kingdom
  - Iranians in the United Kingdom
  - British Turks
- Black British
  - British African-Caribbean community
    - Barbadian British
    - British Jamaican
  - African migration to Britain
    - Ghanaians in the United Kingdom
    - Kenyan migration to the United Kingdom
    - British Nigerian
    - South Africans in the United Kingdom
    - Ugandan migration to the United Kingdom
    - Tanzanians in the United Kingdom
    - Zimbabweans in the United Kingdom
- Latin American migration to the United Kingdom
  - Argentines in the United Kingdom
  - Brazilians in the United Kingdom
  - Colombians in the United Kingdom
  - Ecuadorians in the United Kingdom

== Government, monarchy, politics and honours ==
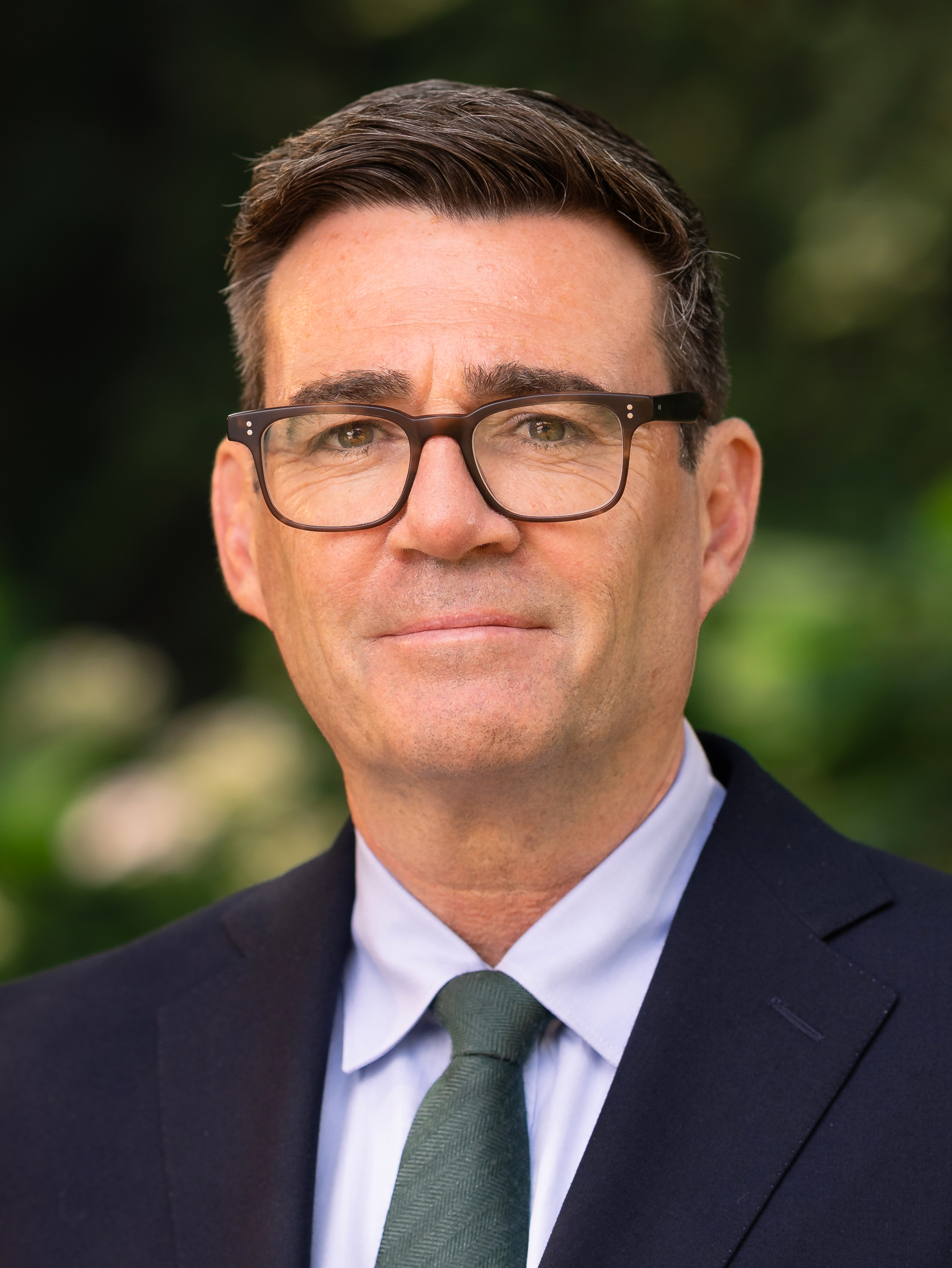
Andy Burnham is the current UK Prime Minister.

- Form of government: parliamentary multi-party representative democratic constitutional monarchy
- Censorship in the United Kingdom
- Elections in the United Kingdom
  - British elections (specific elections)
- Gun politics in the United Kingdom
- Political parties in the United Kingdom
  - Registration of Political Parties Act 1998
  - In the House of Commons
    - Labour Party (UK)
    - Conservative Party (UK)
      - History of the Conservative Party (UK)
        - Return to government: 2010–2024
- Political scandals of the United Kingdom
- Taxation in the United Kingdom

=== Monarchy ===
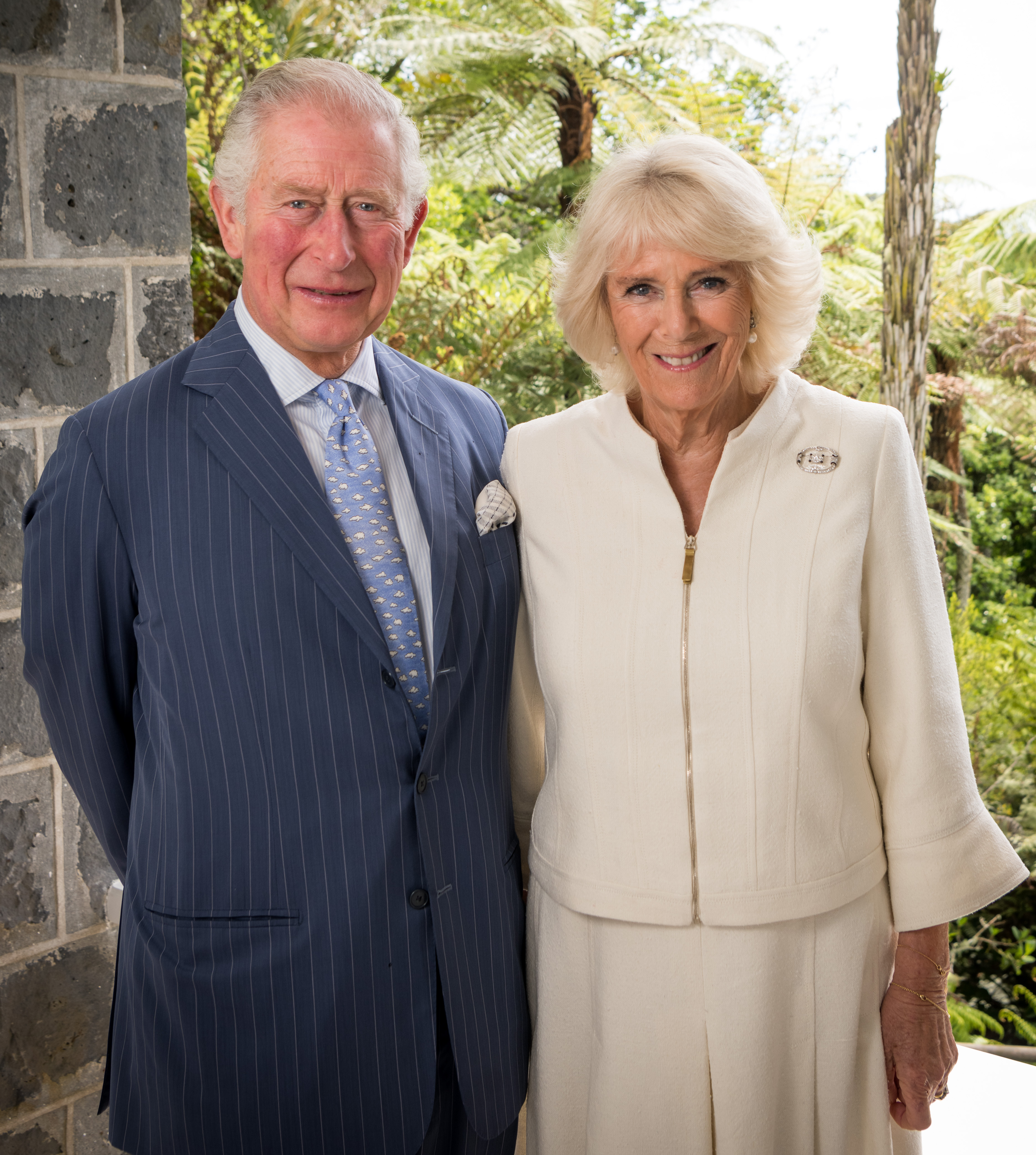
King Charles III and Queen Camilla of the United Kingdom, the present monarch and his consort

- Air transport of the Royal Family and government of the United Kingdom
- British royal family
- British monarchs' family tree
- Monarchy of the United Kingdom
- Coronation of the British monarch
- Household Cavalry
- Household Division
- HMY Britannia
- King's Guard and King's Life Guard
- Line of succession to the British throne
- List of British royal residences
- List of British monarchs
- List of Royal Yachts of the United Kingdom
- List of UK place names with royal patronage
- List of organisations in the United Kingdom with a royal charter
- Royal Assent
- Royal charter
- Royal Christmas Message
- Royal Collection Management Committee
- Royal Collection Trust
- Royal Collection
- Royal Household
- Royal Librarian
- Royal Library, Windsor
- Royal Peculiar
- Royal Philatelic Collection
- Royal Prerogative
- Royal Standard
- Royal Style and Titles Act
- Royal Train
- Royal Warrant of Appointment (United Kingdom)
- Royal coat of arms of the United Kingdom
- Royal forest
- Style of the British sovereign
- Succession to the British Throne

=== Branches of the government ===
==== Executive branch ====
- Head of state: Monarch of the United Kingdom, King Charles III
  - Coronation of the British monarch
    - Crown Jewels of the United Kingdom
- Head of government: Prime Minister of the United Kingdom (list), Andy Burnham
- Cabinet of the United Kingdom
- Departments of the United Kingdom Government

==== Legislative branch ====
- Parliament of the United Kingdom (bicameral)
  - List of parliaments of the United Kingdom
  - List of parliaments of Great Britain
  - Upper house: House of Lords
  - Lower house: House of Commons of the United Kingdom
    - List of British MPs

==== Judicial branch ====
Courts of the United Kingdom

- Courts of England and Wales
- Courts of Northern Ireland
- Courts of Scotland
- Supreme Court of the United Kingdom

=== Foreign relations ===
Foreign relations of the United Kingdom

- History
- Timeline of British diplomatic history
- United Kingdom and the United Nations
- Special Relationship
- Diplomatic missions in the United Kingdom
- Diplomatic missions of the United Kingdom

==== International organisation membership ====
The United Kingdom of Great Britain and Northern Ireland is a member of:

- African Development Bank (AfDB) (nonregional member)
- African Union/United Nations Hybrid Operation in Darfur (UNAMID)
- Arctic Council (observer)
- Asian Development Bank (ADB) (nonregional member)
- AUKUS
- Australia Group
- Bank for International Settlements (BIS)
- British-Irish Council (BIC)
- Caribbean Development Bank (CDB) (nonregional member)
- Commonwealth of Nations
- Comprehensive and Progressive Agreement for Trans-Pacific Partnership (CPTPP)
- Confederation of European Paper Industries (CEPI)
- Council of Europe (CE)
- Council of the Baltic Sea States (CBSS)
- Euro-Atlantic Partnership Council (EAPC)
- European Bank for Reconstruction and Development (EBRD)
- European Investment Bank (EIB)
- European Organization for the Exploitation of Meteorological Satellites (EUMETSAT)
- European Organization for Nuclear Research (CERN)
- European Space Agency (ESA)
- Food and Agriculture Organization (FAO)
- General Conference on Weights and Measures (CGPM)
- Group of Seven (G7)
- Group of Ten (G10)
- Group of Twenty Finance Ministers and Central Bank Governors (G20)
- Inter-American Development Bank (IADB)
- International Atomic Energy Agency (IAEA)
- International Bank for Reconstruction and Development (IBRD)
- International Chamber of Commerce (ICC)
- International Civil Aviation Organization (ICAO)
- International Confederation of Free Trade Unions (ICFTU)
- International Court of Justice (ICJ)
- International Criminal Court (ICCt)
- International Criminal Police Organization – INTERPOL
- International Development Association (IDA)
- International Energy Agency (IEA)
- International Federation of Red Cross and Red Crescent Societies (IFRCS)
- International Finance Corporation (IFC)
- International Fund for Agricultural Development (IFAD)
- International Hydrographic Organization (IHO)
- International Labour Organization (ILO)
- International Maritime Organization (IMO)
- International Mobile Satellite Organization (IMSO)
- International Monetary Fund (IMF)
- International Olympic Committee (IOC)
- International Organization for Migration (IOM)
- International Organization for Standardization (ISO)
- International Red Cross and Red Crescent Movement (ICRM)
- International Telecommunication Union (ITU)
- International Telecommunications Satellite Organization (ITSO)
- International Trade Union Confederation (ITUC)
- International Whaling Commission (IWO)
- Inter-Parliamentary Union (IPU)
- Multilateral Investment Guarantee Agency (MIGA)
- Non-Aligned Movement (NAM) (guest)
- North Atlantic Treaty Organization (NATO)
- Nuclear Energy Agency (NEA)
- Nuclear Suppliers Group (NSG)
- Organisation for Economic Co-operation and Development (OECD)
- Organisation for the Prohibition of Chemical Weapons (OPCW)
- Organization for Security and Co-operation in Europe (OSCE)
- Organization of American States (OAS) (observer)
- Pacific Islands Forum (PIF) (partner)
- Paris Club
- Permanent Court of Arbitration (PCA)
- Secretariat of the Pacific Community (SPC)
- Southeast European Cooperative Initiative (SECI) (observer)
- United Nations (UN)
- United Nations Conference on Trade and Development (UNCTAD)
- United Nations Economic and Social Commission for Asia and the Pacific (UNESCAP)
- United Nations Economic Commission for Africa (UNECA) (associate)
- United Nations Economic Commission for Europe (UNECE)
- United Nations Economic Commission for Latin America and the Caribbean (UNECLAC)
- United Nations Educational, Scientific and Cultural Organization (UNESCO)
- United Nations High Commissioner for Refugees (UNHCR)
- United Nations Industrial Development Organization (UNIDO)
- United Nations Interim Administration Mission in Kosovo (UNMIK)
- United Nations Iraq-Kuwait Observation Mission (UNIKOM)
- United Nations Mission in Bosnia and Herzegovina (UNMIBH)
- United Nations Mission in Liberia (UNMIL)
- United Nations Mission in Sierra Leone (UNAMSIL)
- United Nations Mission in the Democratic Republic of Congo (MONUC)
- United Nations Mission in the Sudan (UNMIS)
- United Nations Observer Mission in Georgia (UNOMIG)
- United Nations Peacekeeping Force in Cyprus (UNFICYP)
- United Nations Relief and Works Agency for Palestine Refugees in the Near East (UNRWA)
- United Nations Security Council (UNSC) (permanent member)
- United Nations Transitional Administration in East Timor (UNTAET)
- United Nations University (UNU)
- Universal Postal Union (UPU)
- World Confederation of Labour (WCL)
- World Customs Organization (WCO)
- World Federation of Trade Unions (WFTU)
- World Health Organization (WHO)
- World Intellectual Property Organization (WIPO)
- World Meteorological Organization (WMO)
- World Organization of the Scout Movement (WOSM)
- World Health Organization (WHO)
- World Tourism Organization (UNWTO)
- World Trade Organization (WTO)
- World Veterans Federation (WVF)
- Zangger Committee (ZC)

=== Local government ===
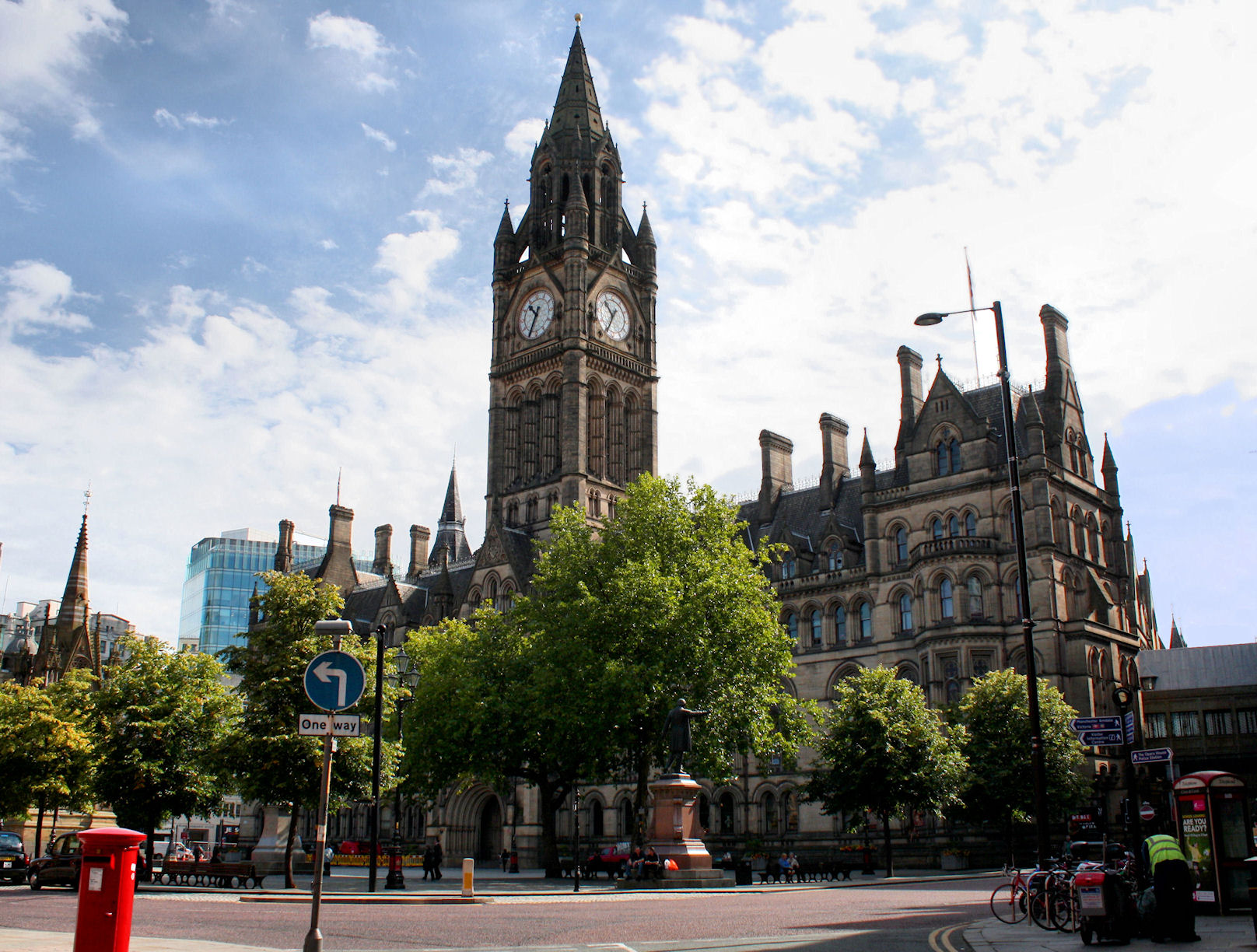
Manchester Town Hall, a centre of local government

- List of local governments in the United Kingdom

=== Politics of England ===
Politics of England

- Regional assemblies in England
- Local government in England
  - History of local government in England
  - Mayors in England

=== Politics of Northern Ireland ===
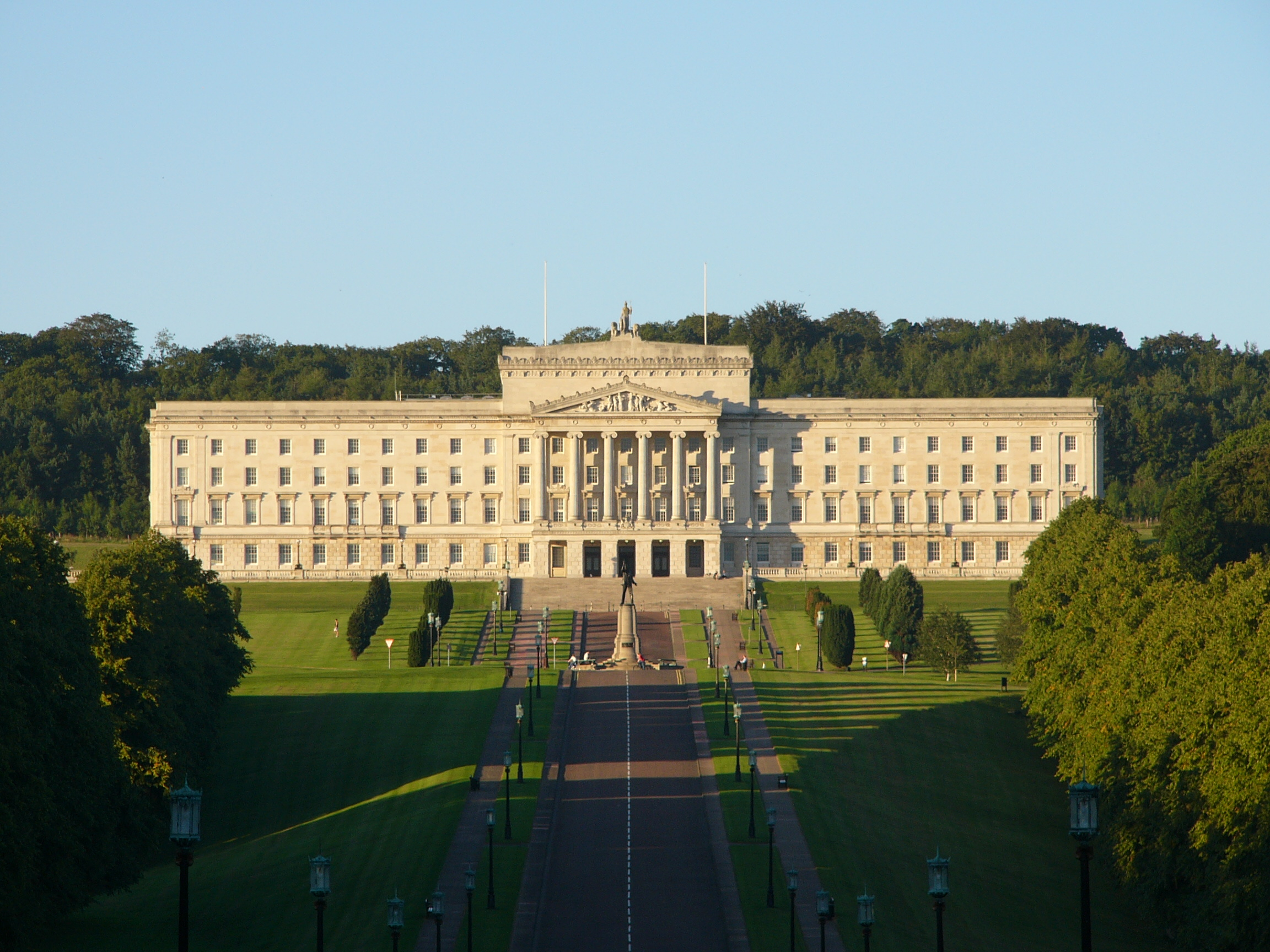
Parliament Buildings at Stormont, Belfast, seat of the Northern Ireland Assembly

Politics of Northern Ireland

- Northern Ireland Assembly
  - First Minister of Northern Ireland, Michelle O'Neill
  - Deputy First Minister of Northern Ireland, Emma Little-Pengelly
- Local government in Northern Ireland
  - History of local government in Northern Ireland
  - Mayors in Northern Ireland
- Northern Ireland Executive

=== Politics of Scotland ===
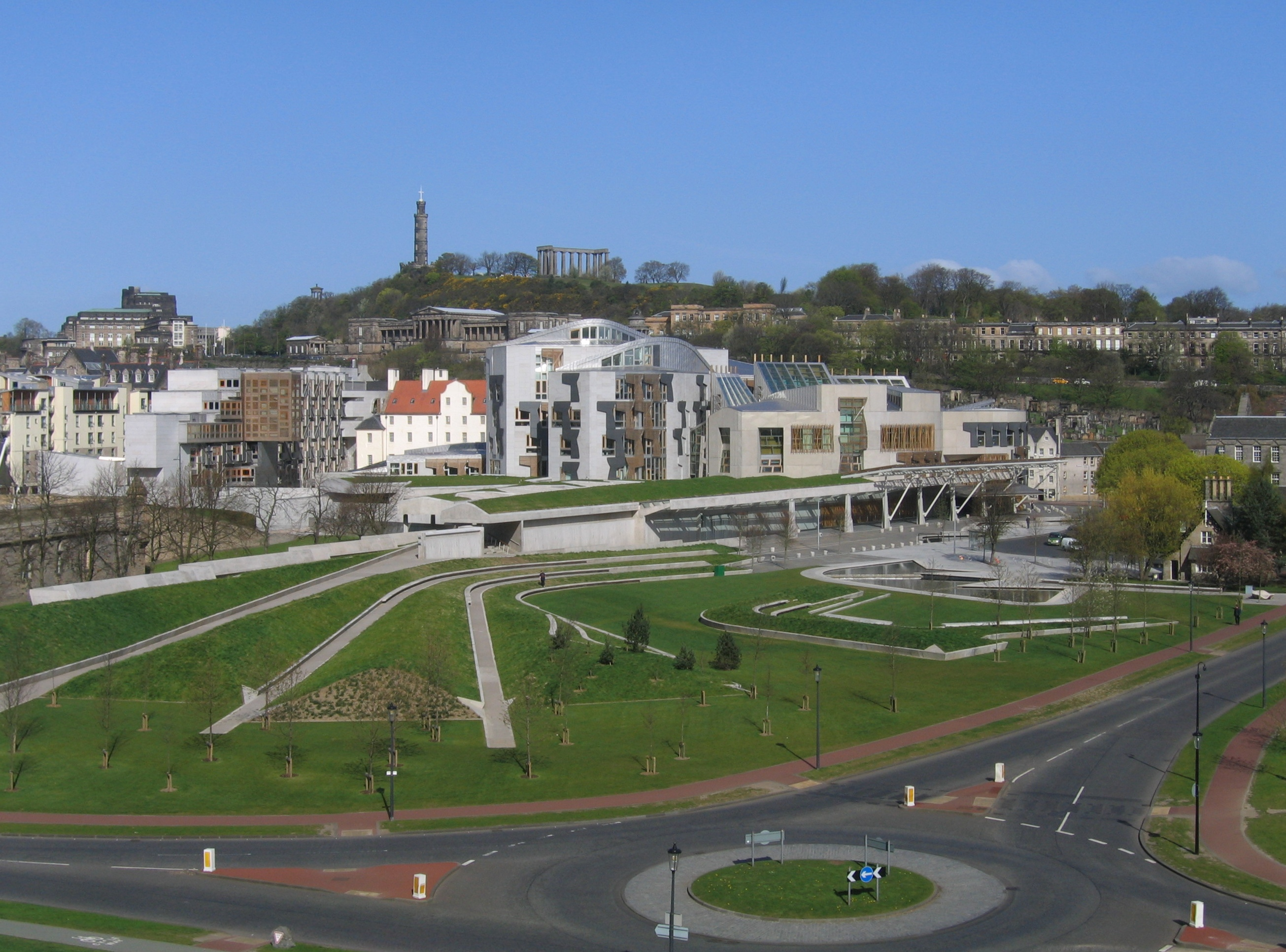
The Scottish Parliament Building in Edinburgh

Politics of Scotland

- Scottish Government
  - First Minister of Scotland, and Keeper of the Great Seal of Scotland, John Swinney
  - Deputy First Minister of Scotland, Jenny Gilruth
  - International relations of Scotland
  - Scottish Cabinet
    - Dewar government (1999–2000)
    - McLeish government (2000–01)
    - First McConnell government (2001–03)
    - Second McConnell government (2003–07)
    - First Salmond government (2007–11)
    - Second Salmond government (2011–14)
    - First Sturgeon government (2014–16)
    - Second Sturgeon government (2016–21)
    - Third Sturgeon government (2021–23)
    - First Yousaf government (2023–24)
    - Second Yousaf government (2024)
    - First Swinney government (2024–2026)
    - Second Swinney government (2026–present)
- History of Scottish devolution
- Local government in Scotland
  - History of local government in Scotland
  - Provosts in Scotland
- Pressure Groups in Scotland
- Scottish Parliament
  - Members of the Scottish Parliament
  - 1999 Scottish Parliament election
  - 2003 Scottish Parliament election
  - 2007 Scottish Parliament election
  - 2011 Scottish Parliament election
  - 2016 Scottish Parliament election
  - 2021 Scottish Parliament election
  - 2026 Scottish Parliament election

=== Politics of Wales ===
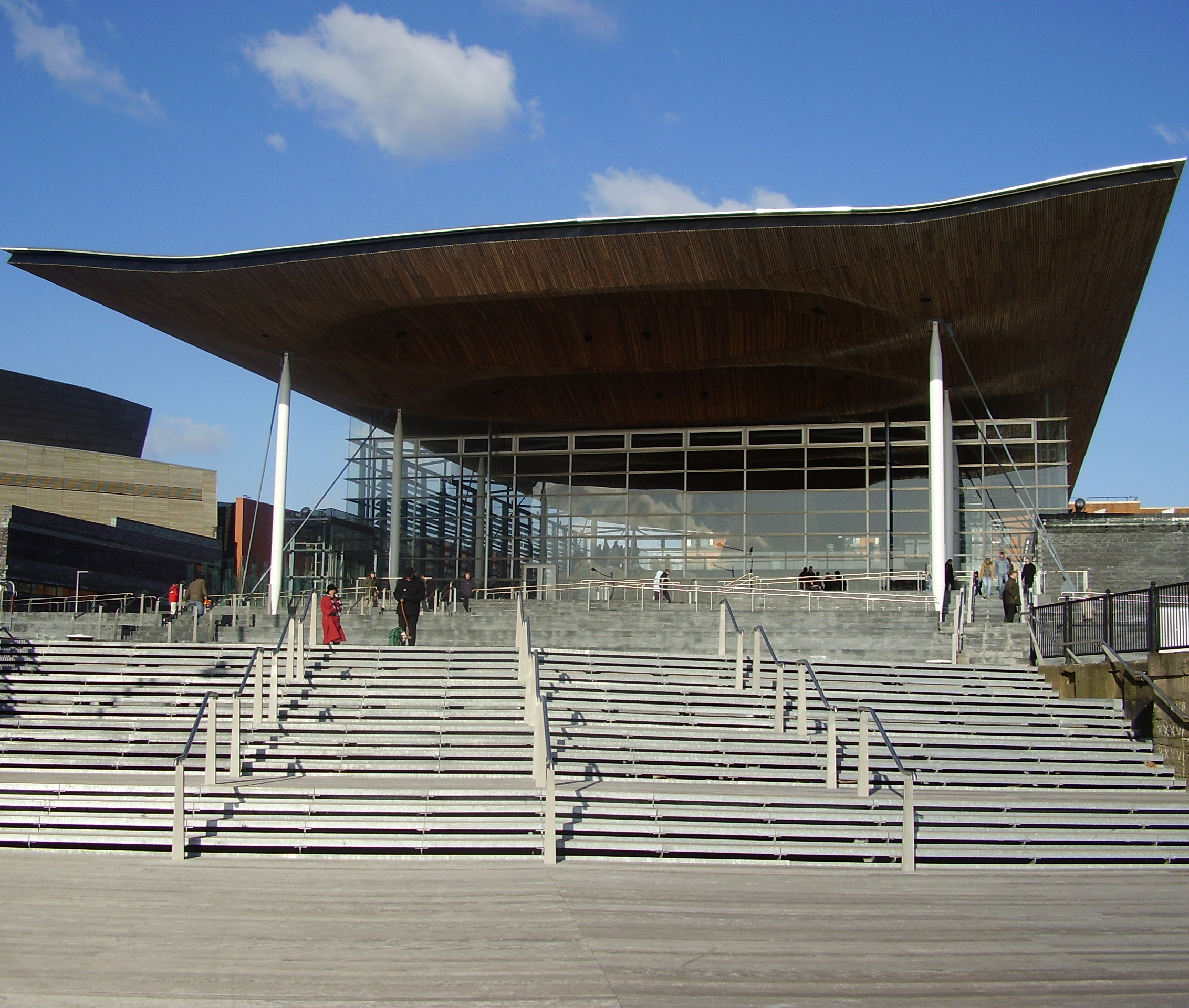
The Senedd building in Cardiff Bay

Politics of Wales

- Local government in Wales
  - History of local government in Wales
  - Mayors in Wales
- Senedd (Welsh Parliament)
  - Member of the Senedd
  - 7th Senedd
  - 2007 National Assembly for Wales election
  - 2011 National Assembly for Wales election
  - 2016 National Assembly for Wales election
  - 2021 Senedd election
  - 2026 Senedd election
  - Welsh Government
    - ap Iorwerth government
    - First Minister of Wales, Rhun ap Iorwerth

=== Honours ===
- New Year Honours
- King's Birthday Honours
- Prime Minister's Resignation Honours
- Chivalric order
  - Chivalric order § Modern orders
- List of honorary British knights and dames
- Category:British honours system
- Declining a British honour

== Military and defence ==
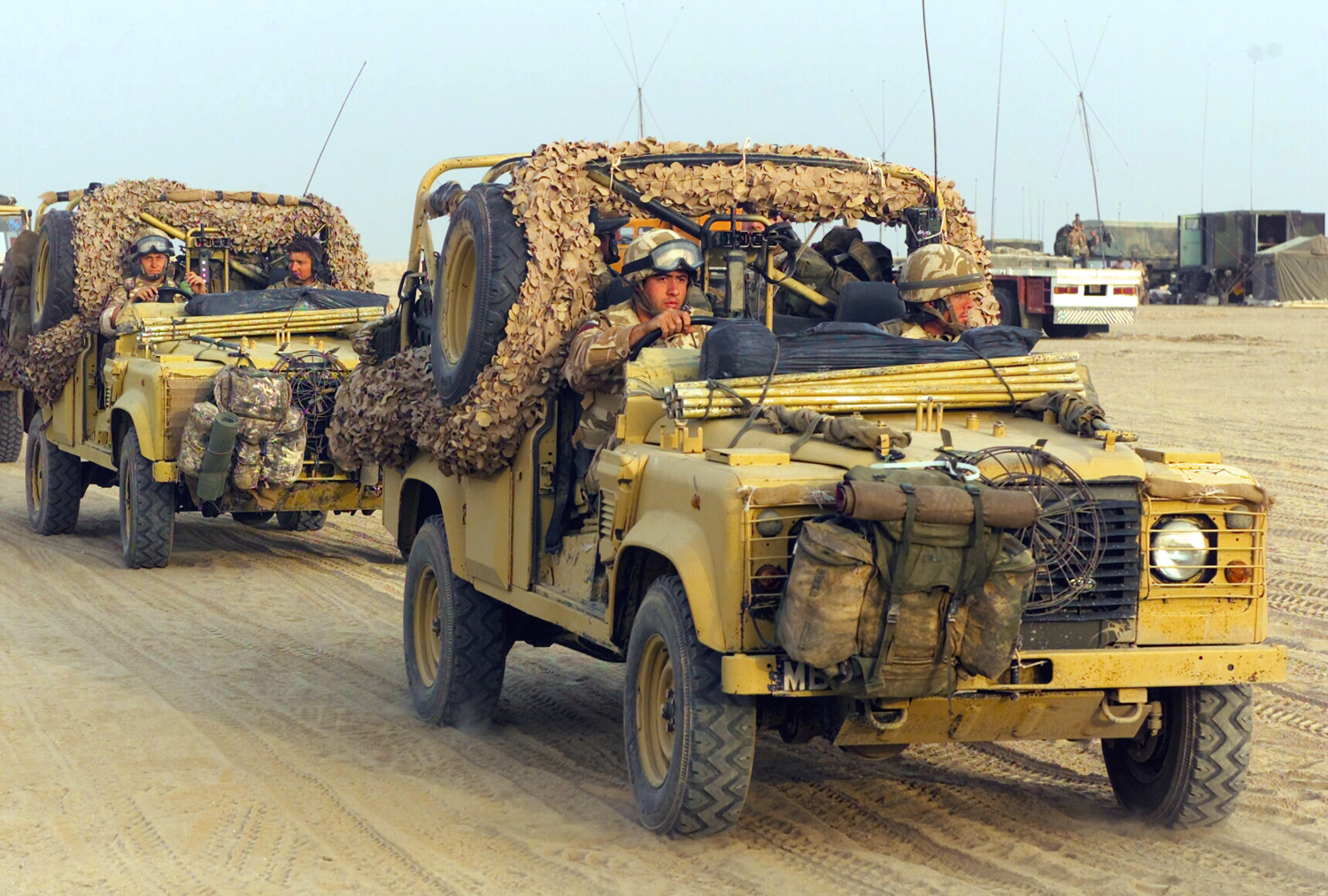
British troops in Iraq

British Armed Forces

=== Command ===
- Commander-in-chief: The Sovereign – King Charles III
  - Chief of the Defence Staff: Admiral Sir Tony Radakin
    - First Sea Lord: Admiral Sir Ben Key
    - Chief of the General Staff: General Sir Patrick Sanders
    - Chief of the Air Staff: Air Chief Marshal Sir Michael Wigston
- Ministry of Defence (United Kingdom)
  - Defence Council of the United Kingdom

=== Forces ===
- British Armed Forces
  - British Army
  - Royal Navy
  - Royal Marines
  - Royal Air Force
  - in Wales

=== Military history ===
Military history of the United Kingdom

=== Related topics ===
- United Kingdom and weapons of mass destruction
  - Nuclear weapons and the United Kingdom

== Law and order ==
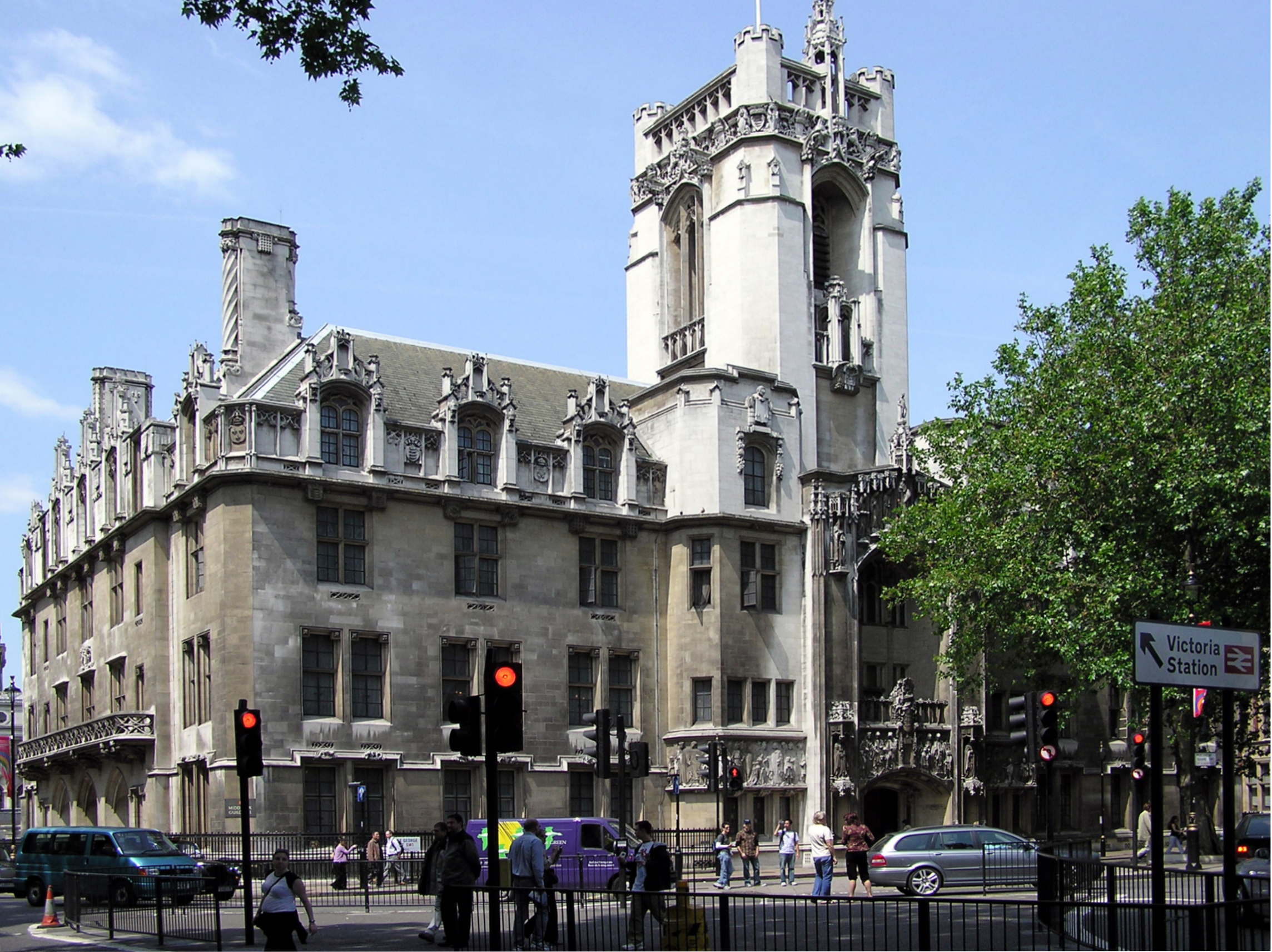
The Middlesex Guildhall is home to the Supreme Court of the United Kingdom.

Law of the United Kingdom

- 9-9-9 emergency telephone number
- British citizenship, British nationality law
- Cannabis in the United Kingdom
- Capital punishment in the United Kingdom
- Common law
- Constitution of the United Kingdom
  - History of the Constitution of the United Kingdom
  - Magna Carta (1215)
  - Petition of Right (1628)
  - Habeas Corpus Act (1679)
  - Bill of Rights (1689)
  - Great Reform Act (1832)
  - Parliament Act (1911)
  - Scotland Act 1998
  - Northern Ireland Act 1998
  - Government of Wales Act 1998
  - House of Lords Act 1999
- Courts of the United Kingdom
- Crime in the United Kingdom
- Law of the European Union
- Human rights in the United Kingdom
  - Civil liberties in the United Kingdom
  - LGBT rights in the United Kingdom
  - Freedom of religion in the United Kingdom
- High treason in the United Kingdom
- Law enforcement in the United Kingdom
  - Diplomatic Protection Group
  - National Crime Agency
  - Special Branch
- List of prisons in the United Kingdom
- United Kingdom prison population

=== Law of England and Wales ===
- Courts of England and Wales
- Crown Prosecution Service
- His Majesty's Prison Service
- Multi-Agency Public Protection Arrangements
- National Offender Management Service
- National Probation Service
- Police Federation of England and Wales
- Prison population of England and Wales
- Serious Fraud Office

=== Law of Northern Ireland ===
Northern Ireland law

- Independent Commission on Policing for Northern Ireland

=== Law of Scotland ===
Scots law

- Courts of Scotland
- Crown Office and Procurator Fiscal Service
- Faculty of Advocates
- Scottish Police Federation
- Scottish Prison Service
- Scottish Crime and Drug Enforcement Agency

== Infrastructure ==
- Water supply and sanitation in the United Kingdom

=== Regulatory bodies ===
- Advertising Standards Authority
- Financial Services Authority or FSA
- Housing Corporation
- Office of Communications (Ofcom)
- Office of the Water Regulator (Ofwat)
- Press Complaints Commission
- Office of the Immigration Services Commissioner (OISC)

=== Trade Union Federations ===
- Irish Congress of Trades Unions
- Trades Union Congress
- Scottish Trades Union Congress

=== Transport ===
Transport in the United Kingdom

- British Rail
- Airports in the United Kingdom
- Bus transport in the United Kingdom
- Coach transport in the United Kingdom
- List of long-distance footpaths in the United Kingdom
- Railway system
  - History of rail transport
  - List of railway viaducts in the United Kingdom
  - Stations A-Z
  - London Underground
- Trams and Light Rail Trams and light rail systems
- Roads in the United Kingdom
  - British car number plates
  - Great Britain road numbering scheme
  - List of car manufacturers of the United Kingdom
  - List of motorways in the United Kingdom
  - Motoring taxation in the United Kingdom
- Waterways in the United Kingdom
  - British Waterways
  - Waterways Ireland
  - History of the British canal system
- Tunnels in the United Kingdom
- Cycleways in the United Kingdom
- Common Travel Area
- Transport Scotland

== Economy ==
Economy of the United Kingdom

- Economic rank, by nominal GDP (2008): 6th (sixth)
- Economic history of the United Kingdom
  - The Industrial Revolution
  - The Great Depression in the United Kingdom
- Financial services industry of the United Kingdom
  - Banking in the United Kingdom
  - Banks of the United Kingdom
    - Bank of England
    - Bank of Scotland
    - Royal Bank of Scotland
  - London Stock Exchange
    - FTSE 100 Index
  - Private finance initiative
  - Currency of the United Kingdom: pound sterling
    - ISO 4217: GBP
    - British coinage
    - British banknotes
    - Pound sterling
- Communications in the United Kingdom
  - Internet in the United Kingdom
- Companies of the United Kingdom
- Manufacturing in the United Kingdom
  - Automotive industry in the United Kingdom
  - Aerospace industry in the United Kingdom
  - Pharmaceutical industry in the United Kingdom
- Construction industry of the United Kingdom
- Mining in the United Kingdom
  - North Sea oil
- Energy in the United Kingdom
  - Energy use and conservation in the United Kingdom
  - Energy policy of the United Kingdom
    - Energy policy of Scotland
- Legal services in the United Kingdom
- Real estate in the United Kingdom
- Tourism in the United Kingdom
  - Tourism in England
  - Tourism in Scotland
  - Tourism in Wales
  - Tourism in Northern Ireland
- Transport in the United Kingdom
- Economy of London
  - City of London

== History ==
"A new map of Great Britain according to the newest and most exact observations" (1730)

- History of the United Kingdom
  - Timeline of British history
- History of England
  - Social history of England
  - Timeline of English history
- History of Scotland
  - Timeline of Scottish history
- History of Wales
- History of Northern Ireland
  - Plantation of Ulster
- History of the formation of the United Kingdom
  - Treaty of Union
  - Acts of Union 1707
  - Act of Union 1800
- British Empire and the Commonwealth
- UK underground

=== History by period ===
- Georgian era
- Victorian era
- Edwardian era
- First World War
- Interwar
- Second World War
  - civilian
  - military
- Postwar
  - political
  - social
- Since 1979
  - political
  - social

=== Historical states of the British Isles ===
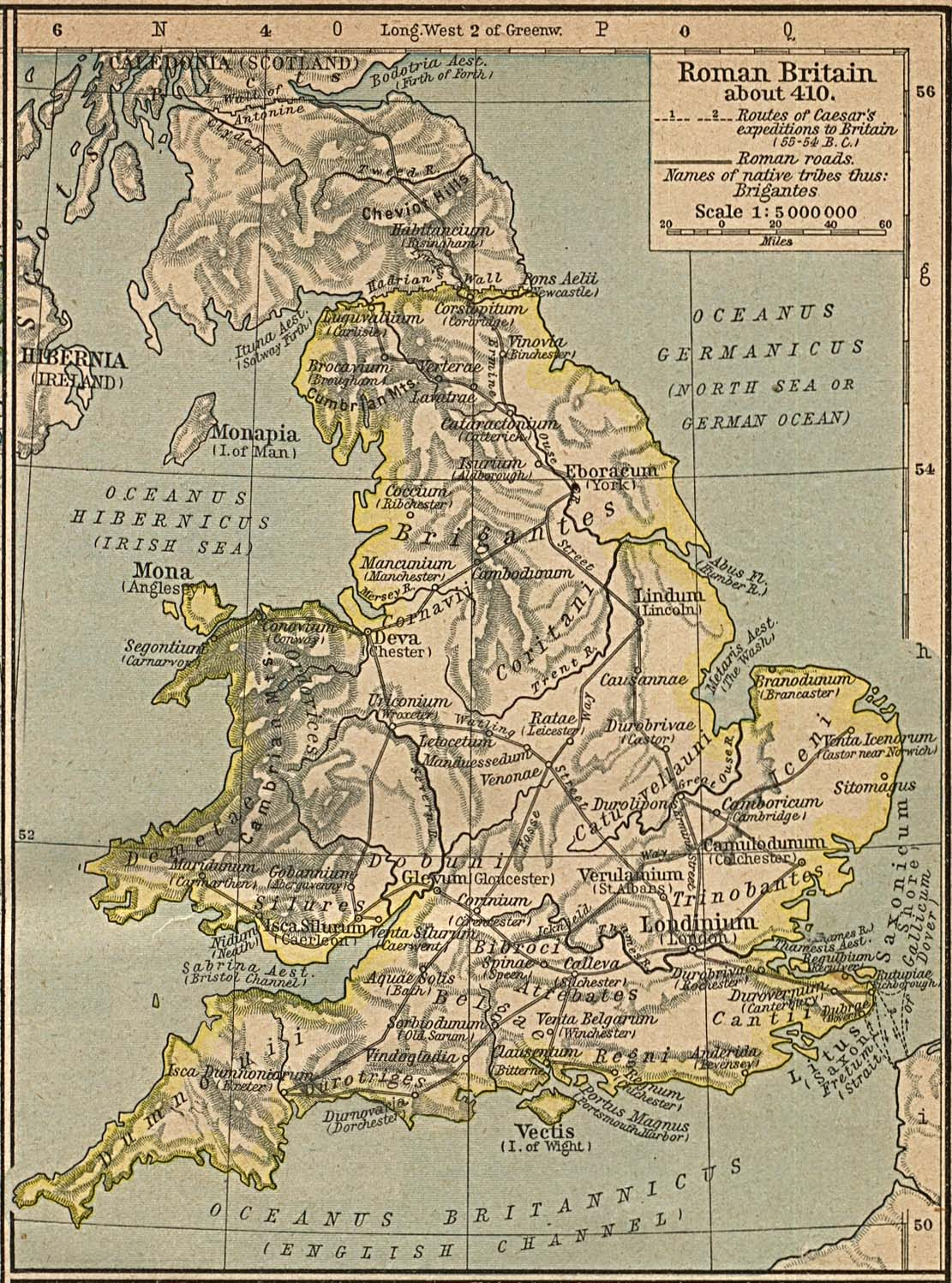
Roman Britain in 410

- Ancient Britain
- Avalon
- Roman Britain
- Caledonia
- Hibernia
- Kingdom of the Picts
- Kingdom of the Scots
- Heptarchy
- States in Medieval Britain
- Commonwealth of England
- Kingdom of England
- Kingdom of Ireland
- Kingdom of Scotland (when Picts and Scots merged in 843)
- Kingdom of Great Britain (when England & Scotland merged in 1707);
- United Kingdom of Great Britain and Ireland (when Great Britain and Ireland merged in 1801)

=== By subject ===
- Economic history of the United Kingdom
  - Economic history of Scotland
- Maritime history of the United Kingdom
  - Maritime history of England
  - Maritime history of Scotland
- Military history of the United Kingdom
  - Military history of the United Kingdom during World War II
  - Bletchley Park
- History of agriculture in Scotland
- History of Bangladeshis in the United Kingdom
- History of Christianity in Scotland
- History of company law in the United Kingdom
- History of education in England
- History of education in Scotland
- History of electroconvulsive therapy in the United Kingdom
- History of fire brigades in the United Kingdom
- History of fire safety legislation in the United Kingdom
- History of football in England
- History of football in Scotland
- History of labour law in the United Kingdom
- History of law enforcement in the United Kingdom
- History of lidos in the United Kingdom
- History of local government in the United Kingdom
  - History of local government in England
  - History of local government in Scotland
  - History of local government in Wales
- History of medical regulation in the United Kingdom
- History of Megabus routes in the United Kingdom
- History of metrication in the United Kingdom
- History of psychosurgery in the United Kingdom
- History of rail transport in the United Kingdom
- History of rugby union in Scotland
- History of taxation in the United Kingdom
- History of the Church of England
- History of the Constitution of the United Kingdom
- History of the formation of the United Kingdom
- History of the Green Party of England and Wales
- History of the Jews in the United Kingdom
  - History of the Jews in England
    - History of the Jews in England (1066–1290)
  - History of the Jews in Northern Ireland
  - History of the Jews in Scotland
  - History of the Jews in Wales
- History of the Marranos in England
- History of rail transport in Great Britain
- History of rail transport in Ireland
- History of the Reformation in Scotland
- History of the socialist movement in the United Kingdom
- History of the trust movement in Scotland
- History of trial by jury in England
- History of violence against LGBT people in the United Kingdom

== Culture ==
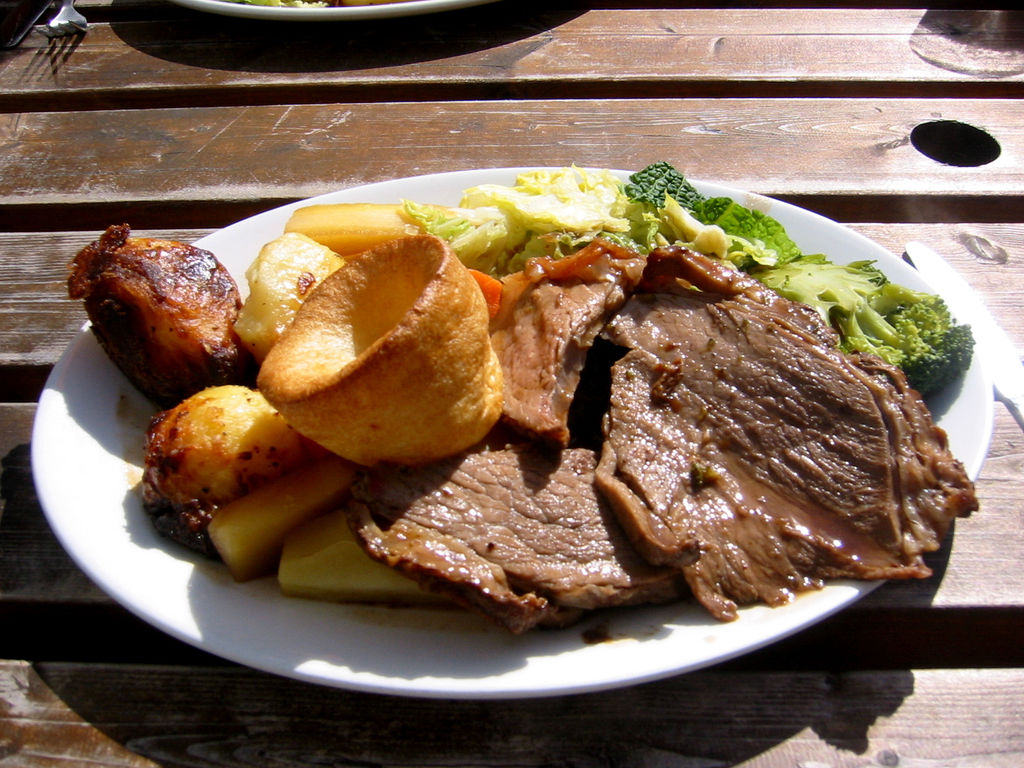
Sunday roast consisting of roast beef, roast potatoes, vegetables and Yorkshire pudding

Culture of the United Kingdom

- British cuisine
  - English cuisine
  - Northern Irish cuisine
  - Irish cuisine
  - Scottish cuisine
  - Welsh cuisine
- Festivals in the United Kingdom
- Gambling in the United Kingdom
- British humour
- Marriage in the United Kingdom
  - Marriage in England and Wales
  - Marriage in Northern Ireland
  - Marriage in Scotland
  - Civil partnership in the United Kingdom
- Media of the United Kingdom
- Symbols of the United Kingdom, the Channel Islands and the Isle of Man
  - Coat of arms of the United Kingdom
  - Flag of the United Kingdom
    - Union Jack
  - National anthem of the United Kingdom
- Prostitution in the United Kingdom
- Public holidays in the United Kingdom
- Religion in the United Kingdom
  - Buddhism in the United Kingdom
  - Christianity in the United Kingdom
  - Hinduism in the United Kingdom
  - Islam in the United Kingdom
  - Judaism in the United Kingdom
  - Sikhism in the United Kingdom
- World Heritage Sites in the United Kingdom

=== Architecture ===
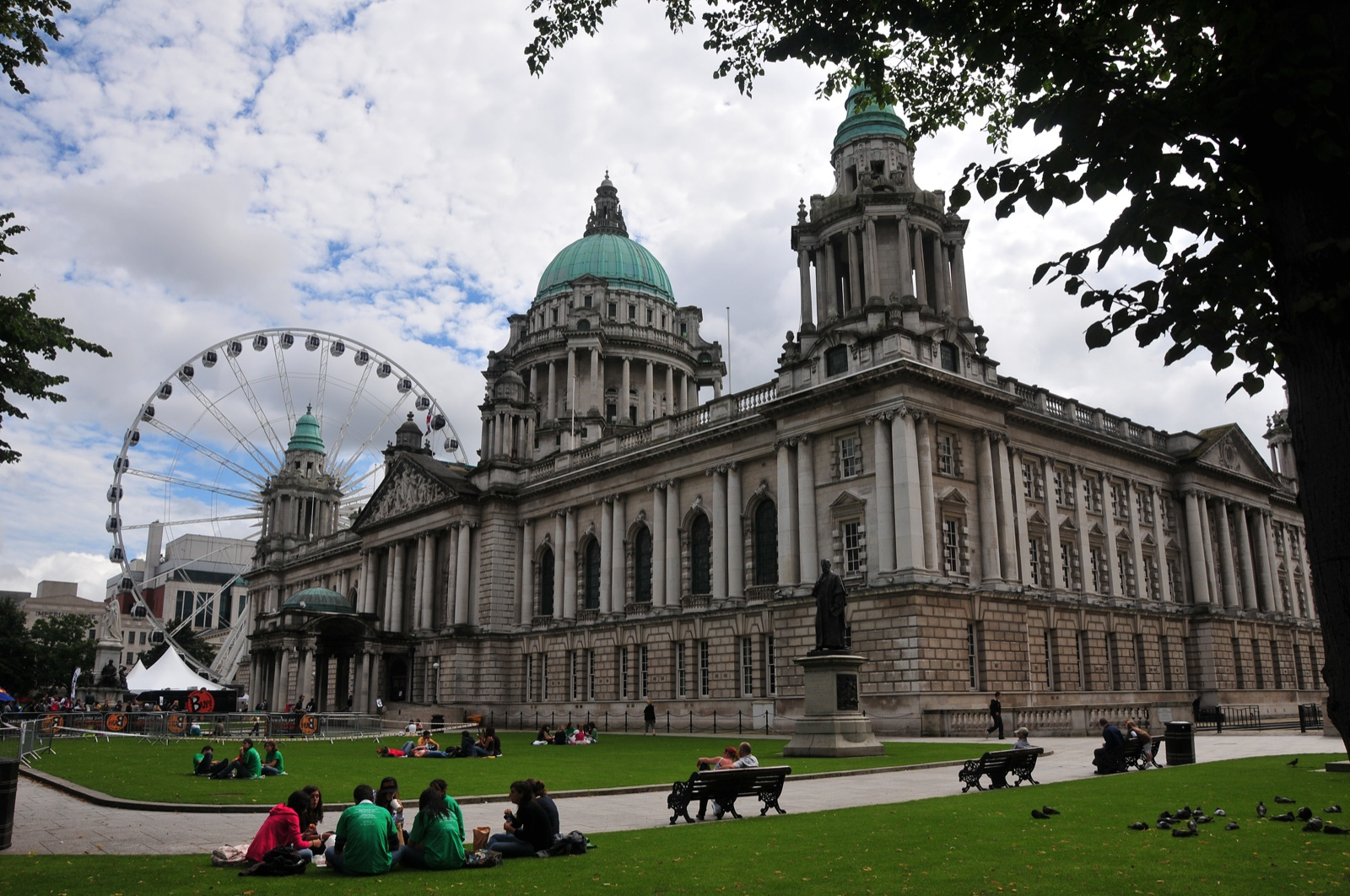
Belfast City Hall is a municipal building in the Edwardian Baroque style.

Architecture of the United Kingdom

- Cathedrals in the United Kingdom
- Council houses
- Energy efficiency in British housing
- Housing associations
- List of bridges in the United Kingdom
- National House Building Council
- New towns
- Piers (England and Wales)
- Reservoirs and dams in the United Kingdom
- Town and Country Planning in the United Kingdom

==== Architecture of England ====
- List of monastic houses in England
- Crossing the Thames, including tunnels
- List of country houses in the United Kingdom
- Housing Corporation

==== Architecture of Scotland ====
- List of monastic houses in Scotland

==== Architecture of Wales ====
- List of monastic houses in Wales

==== Architecture of Northern Ireland ====
- List of monastic houses in Ireland

==== Gardens ====
- List of botanical gardens in the United Kingdom
- Gardens in England
- Gardens in Scotland
- Gardens in Wales
- Gardens in Northern Ireland

=== The arts ===
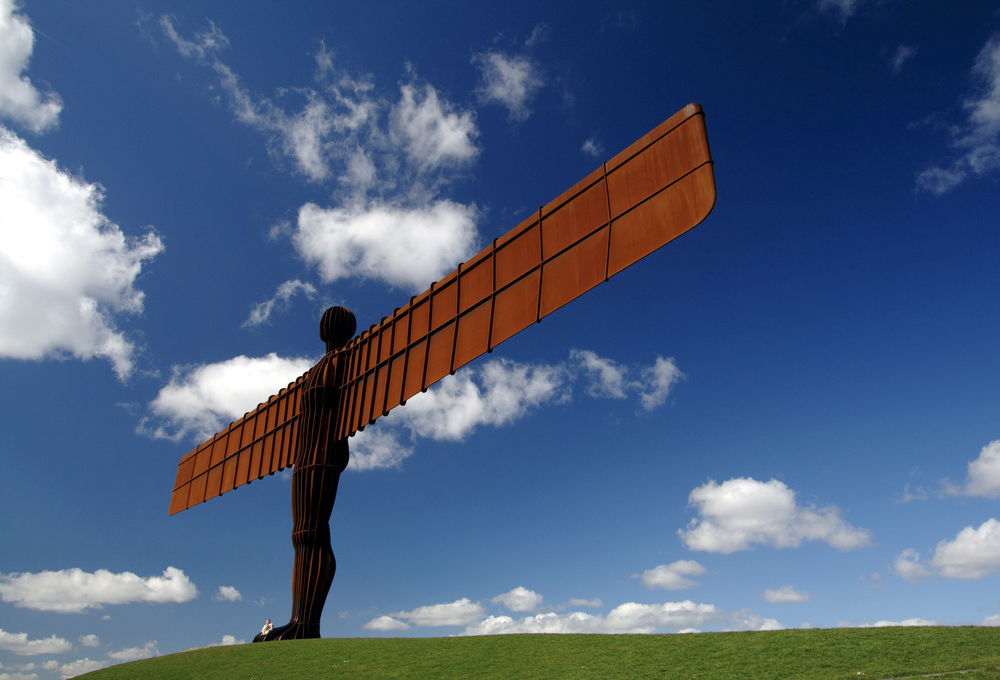
The Angel of the North near Gateshead by Antony Gormley, 1998

- Art of the United Kingdom
  - Crown Jewels of the United Kingdom
  - Pornography in the United Kingdom
- British comedy
- Cinema of the United Kingdom
- Literature of the United Kingdom
  - List of English writers
- Music of the United Kingdom
- Television in the United Kingdom
- Theatre of the United Kingdom
  - List of British playwrights
  - List of theatres in the United Kingdom

==== Museums ====
- Museums in England
- Museums in Northern Ireland
- Museums in Scotland
- Museums in Wales
- List of British railway museums

=== Music ===
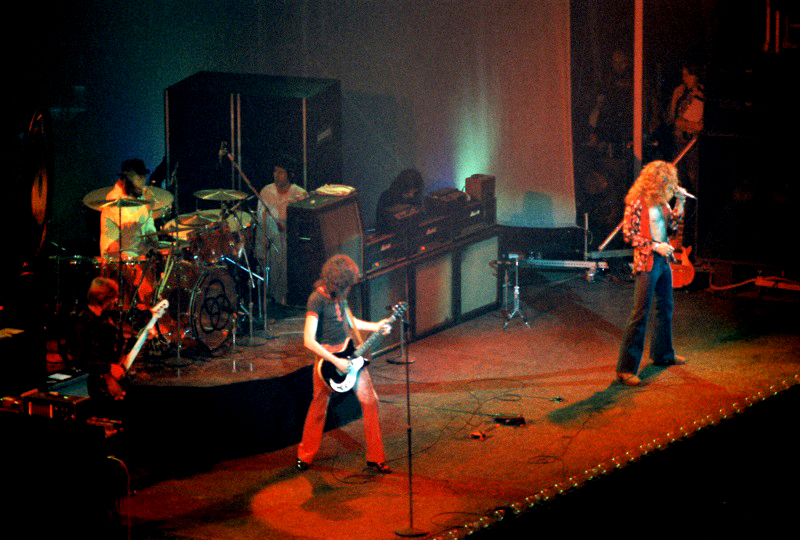
Led Zeppelin performing in 1975

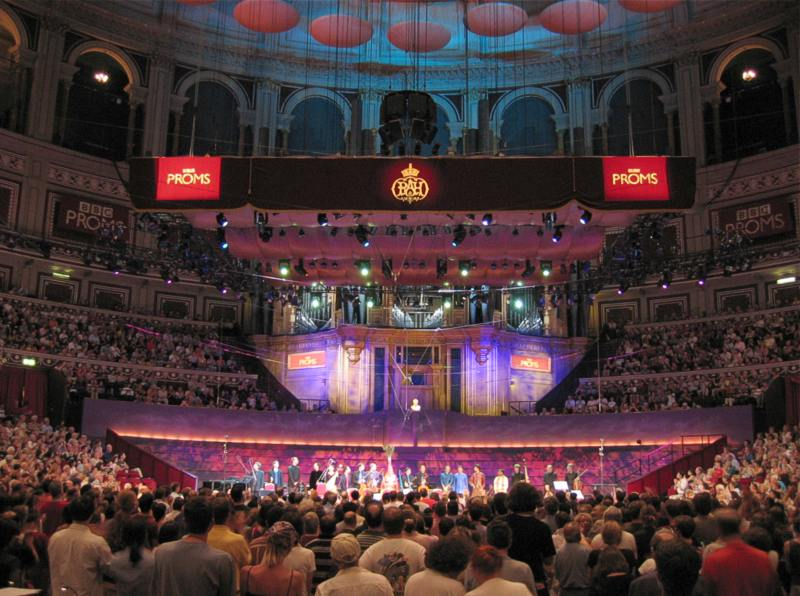
The Proms in 2004

- Music of the United Kingdom
  - List of music festivals in the United Kingdom

==== Popular music ====
- British pop music
- British popular music
- Early British popular music
- British Invasion
- New wave of British heavy metal
- Britpop
- List of one-hit wonders on the UK Singles Chart
- United Kingdom in the Eurovision Song Contest
- Music Hall

==== Classical music ====
- BBC Symphony Orchestra
- BBC National Orchestra of Wales
- BBC Scottish Symphony Orchestra
- BBC Philharmonic Orchestra
- City of Birmingham Symphony Orchestra (CBSO)
- Hallé Orchestra
- Royal Liverpool Philharmonic Orchestra
- Royal Philharmonic Orchestra
- Royal Scottish National Orchestra
- Philharmonia
- London Symphony Orchestra
- London Philharmonic Orchestra
- Bournemouth Symphony Orchestra
- Scottish Chamber Orchestra
- The Proms
- British opera
- Ulster Orchestra

==== Folk music ====
- Music of England
- Music of Northern Ireland
- Music of Scotland
- Music of Wales

==== Theatre ====
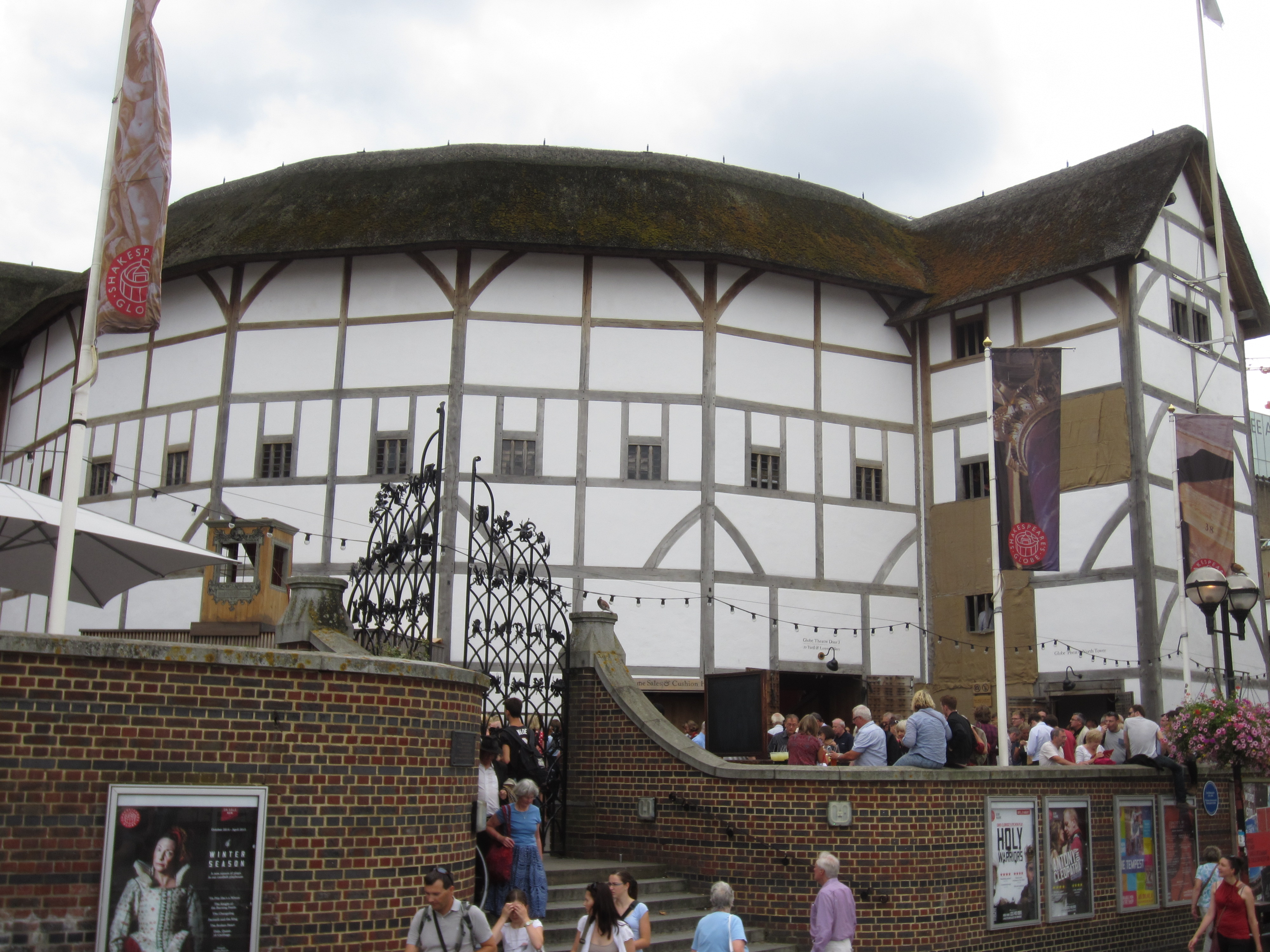
Shakespeare's Globe

- Royal Academy of Dramatic Art
- Royal National Theatre
- Laurence Olivier Awards
- Theatres in England
- Theatres in Northern Ireland
- Theatres in Scotland
- Theatres in Wales

=== Film ===
Cinema of the United Kingdom

- British Film Institute
  - BFI Top 100 British films
- National Film and Television Archive
- British Academy of Film and Television Arts (BAFTA)
- British Independent Film Awards
- Carry On films

=== Cultural icons ===
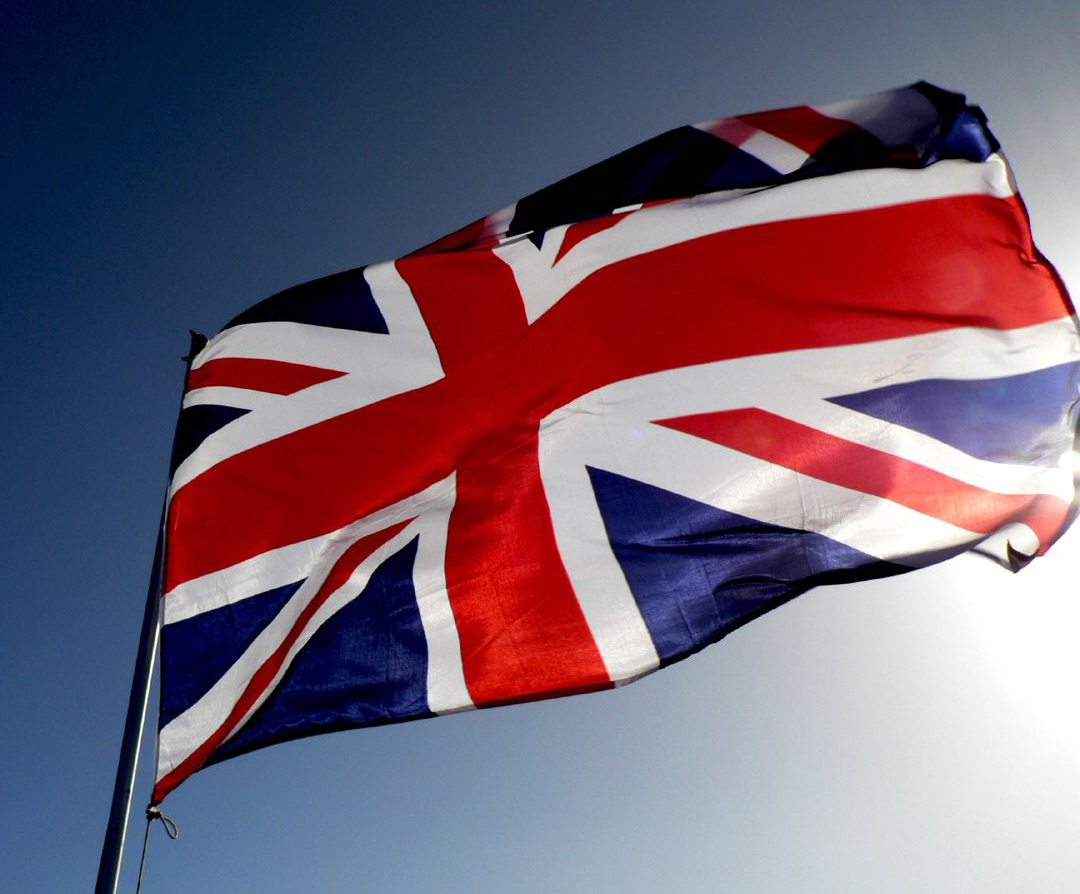
Union Flag

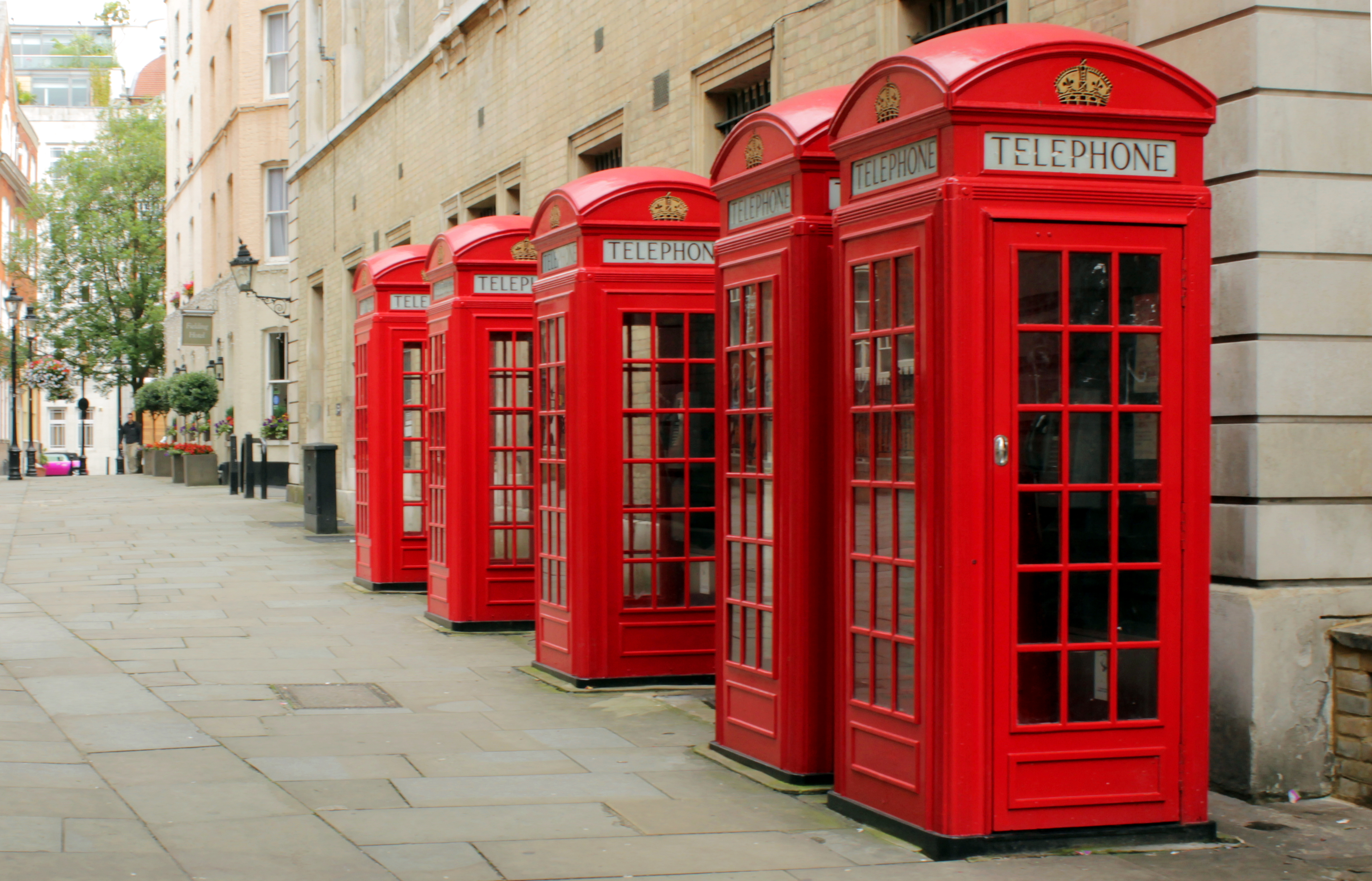
Row of phone boxes in Covent Garden

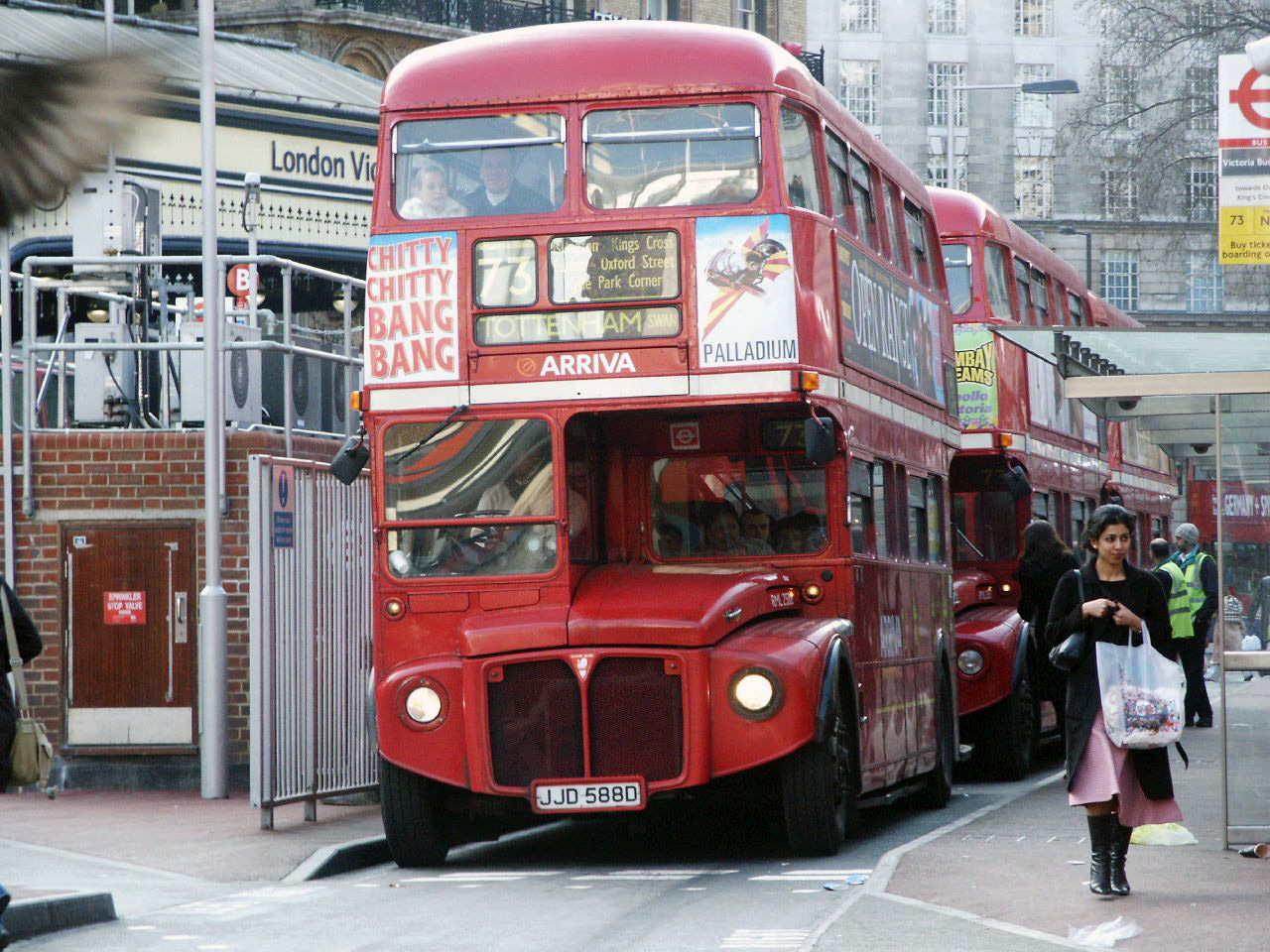
AEC Routemaster bus

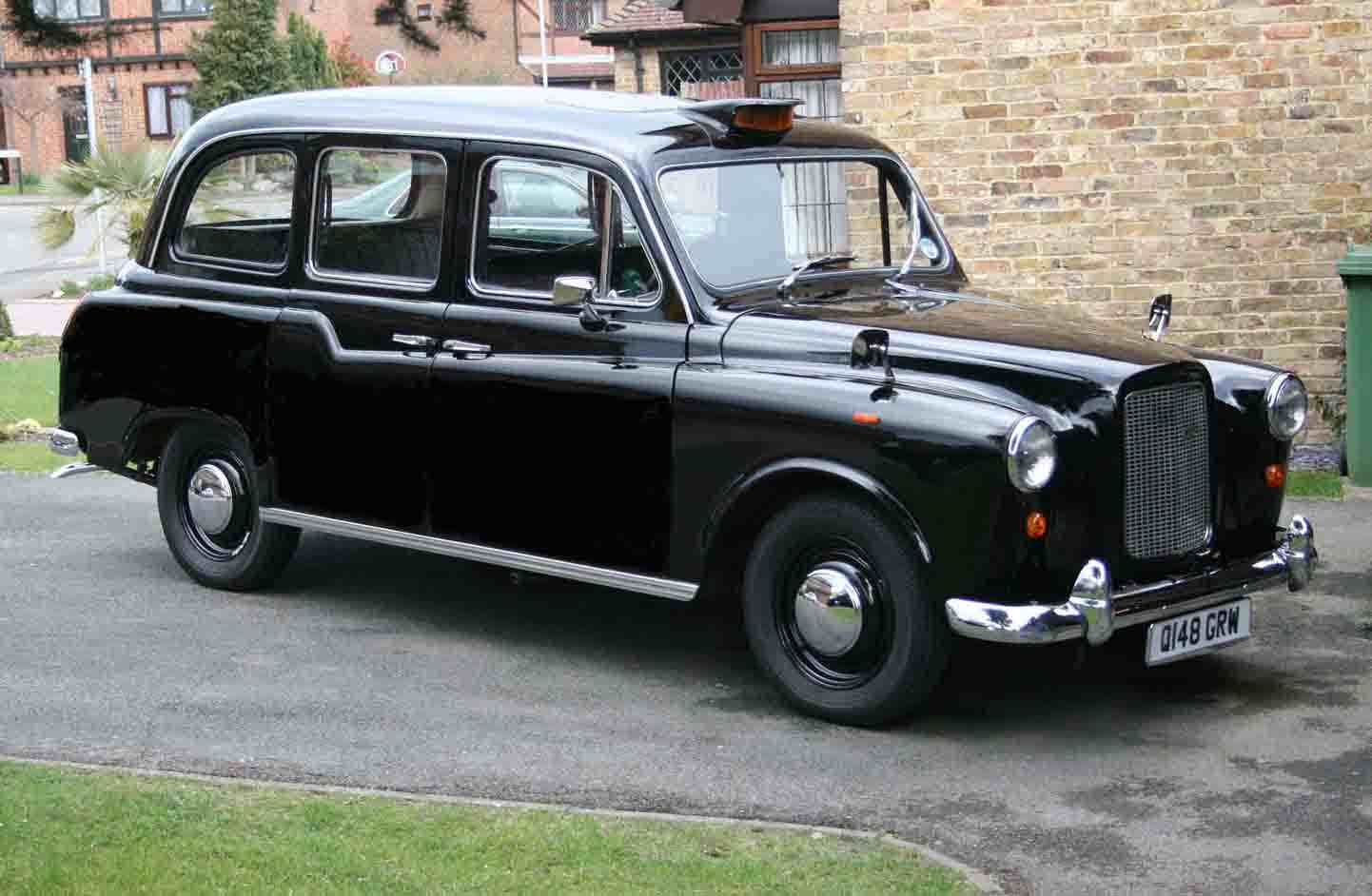
Black cab

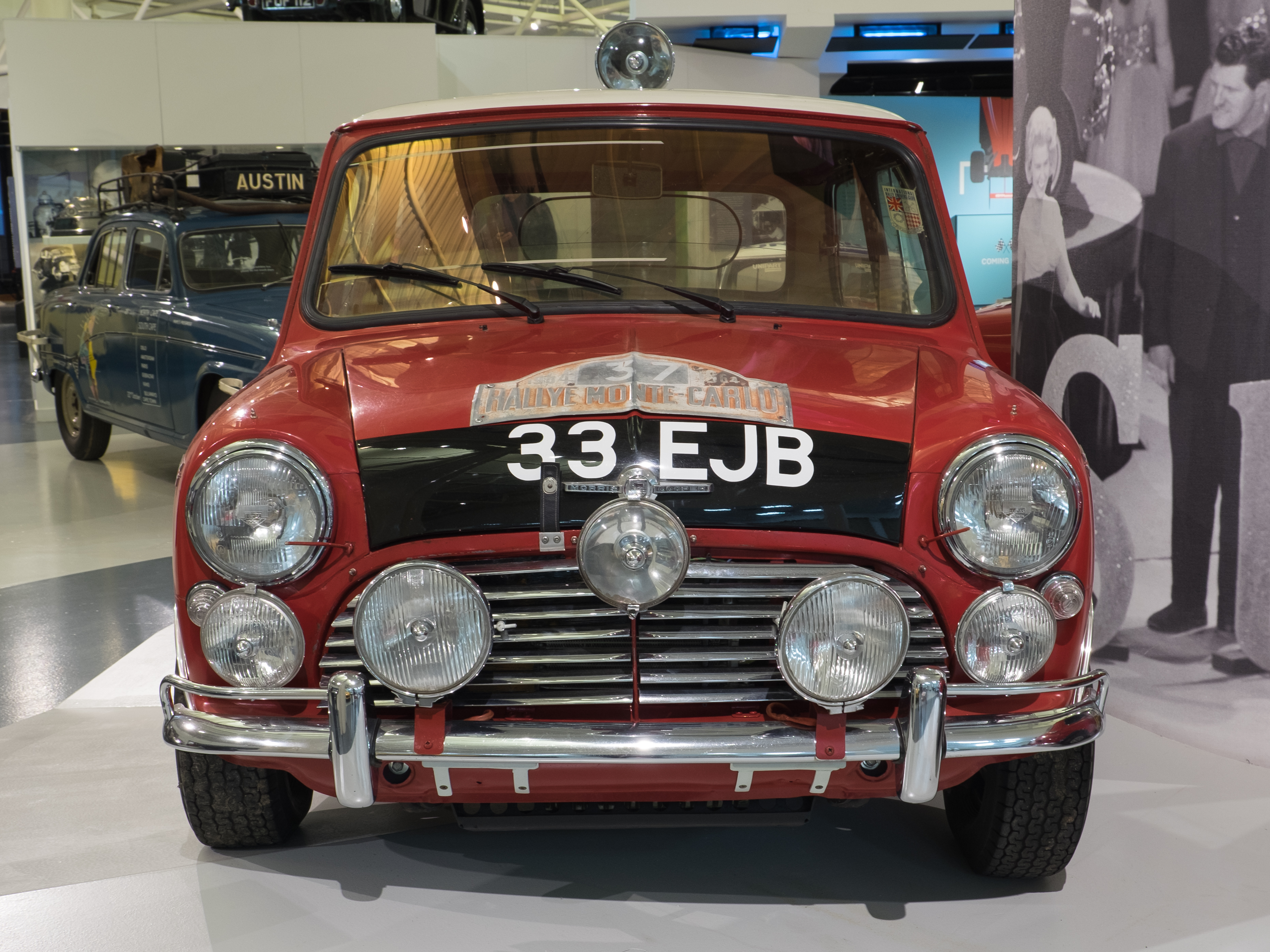
Mini Cooper S

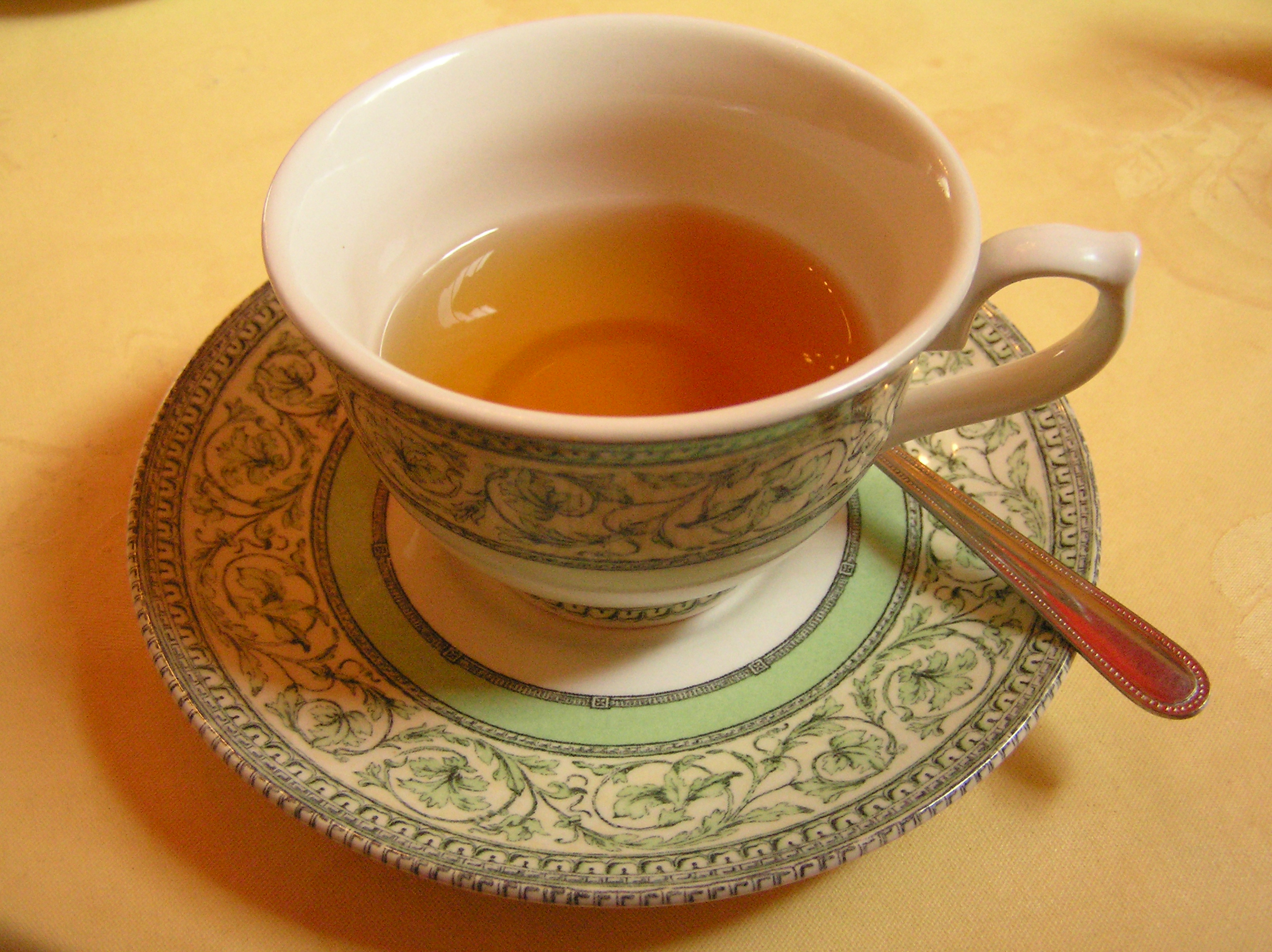
A cup of tea

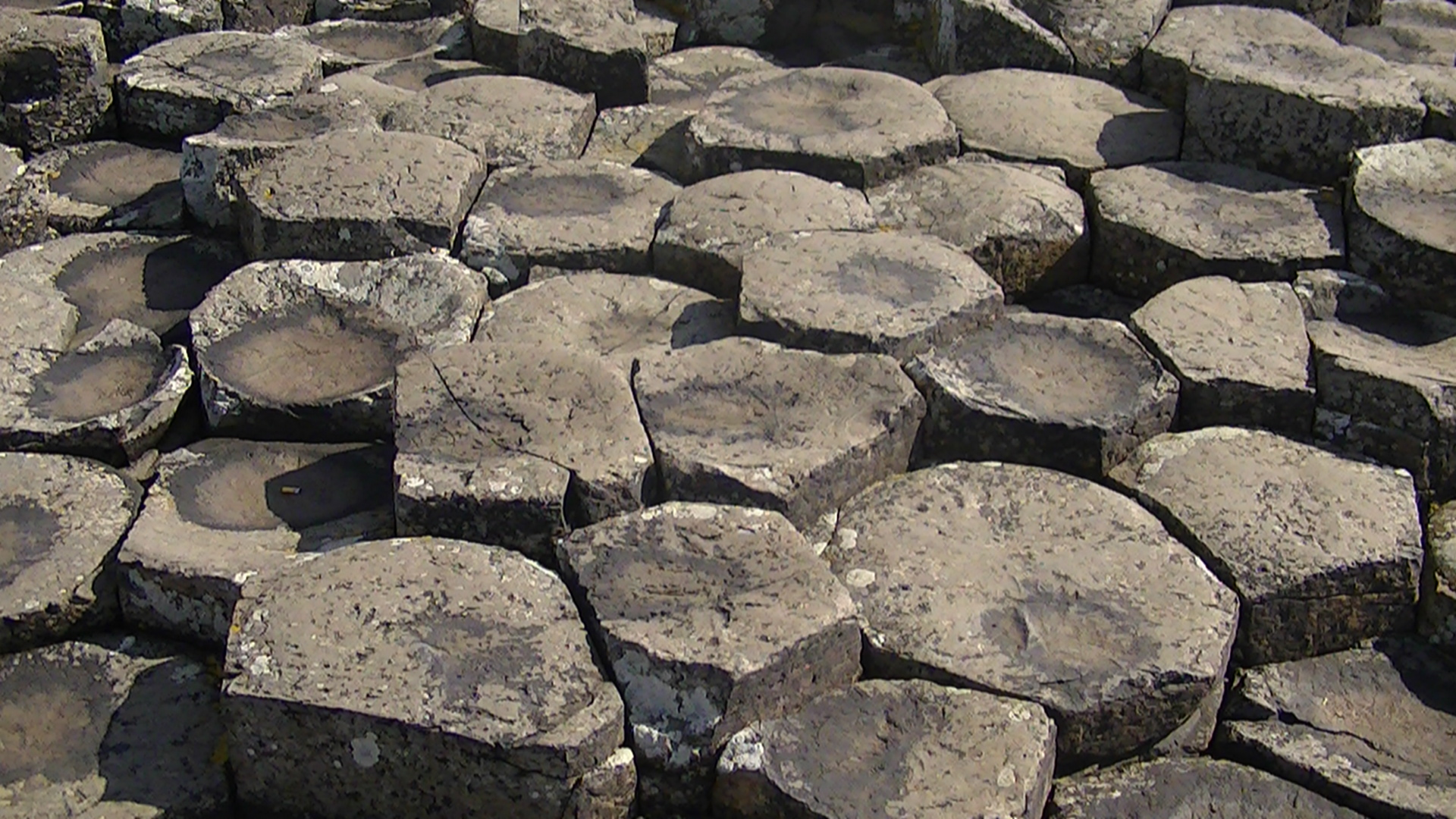
Giant's Causeway stones

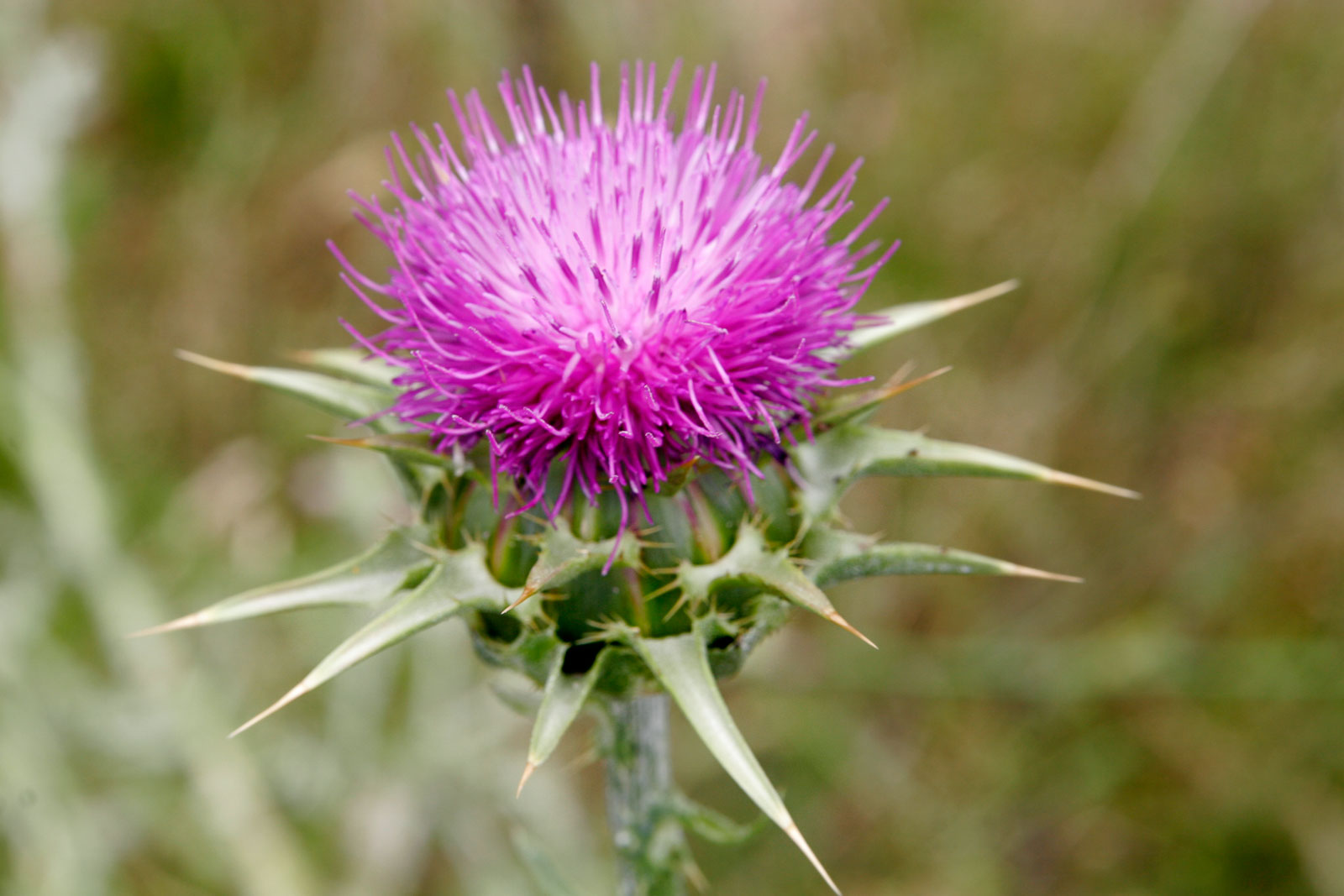
A thistle

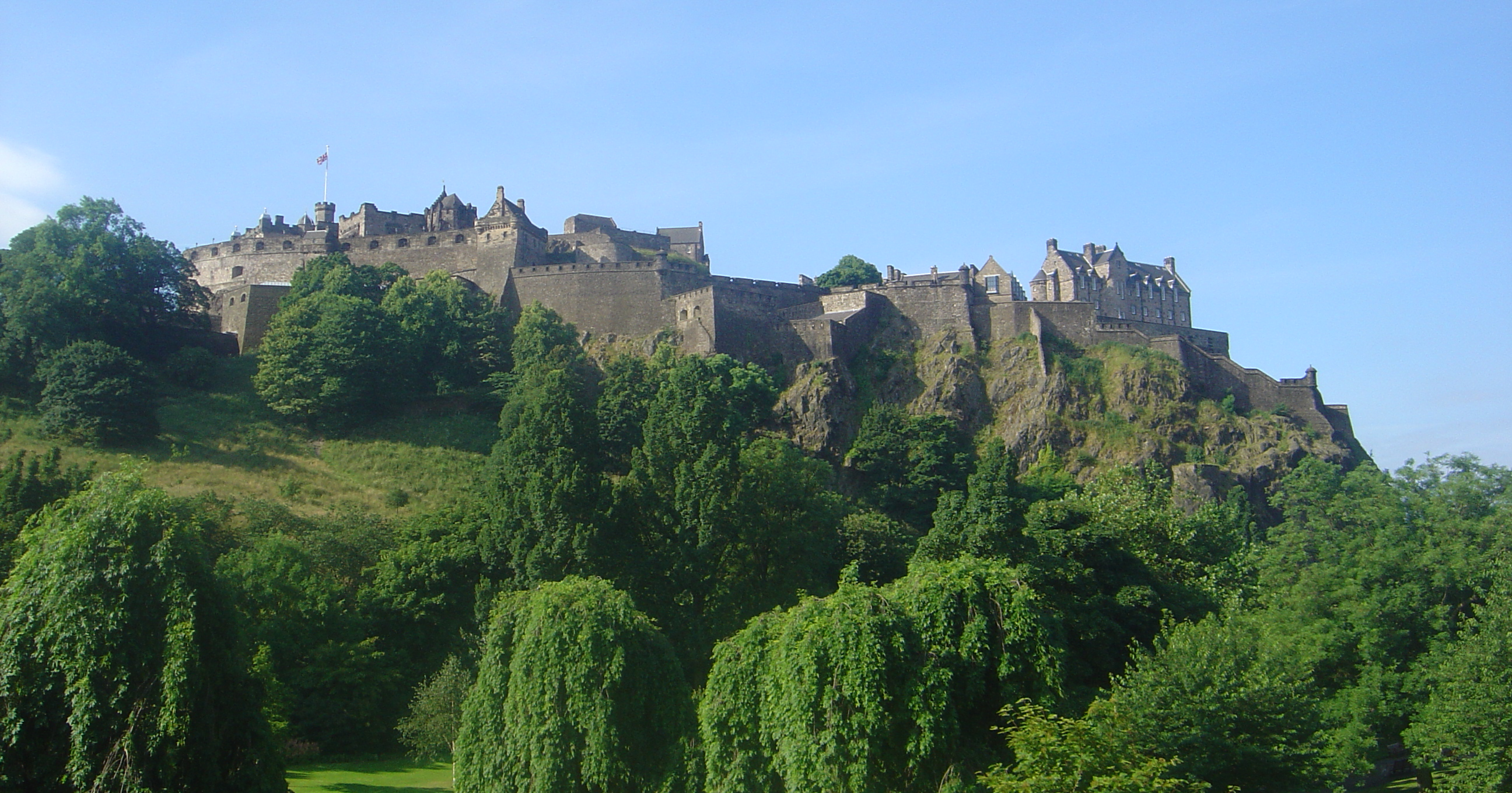
Edinburgh Castle

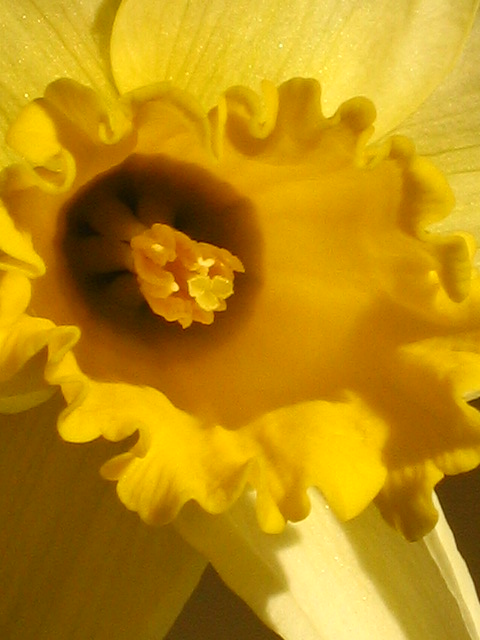
A daffodil, a national symbol of Wales

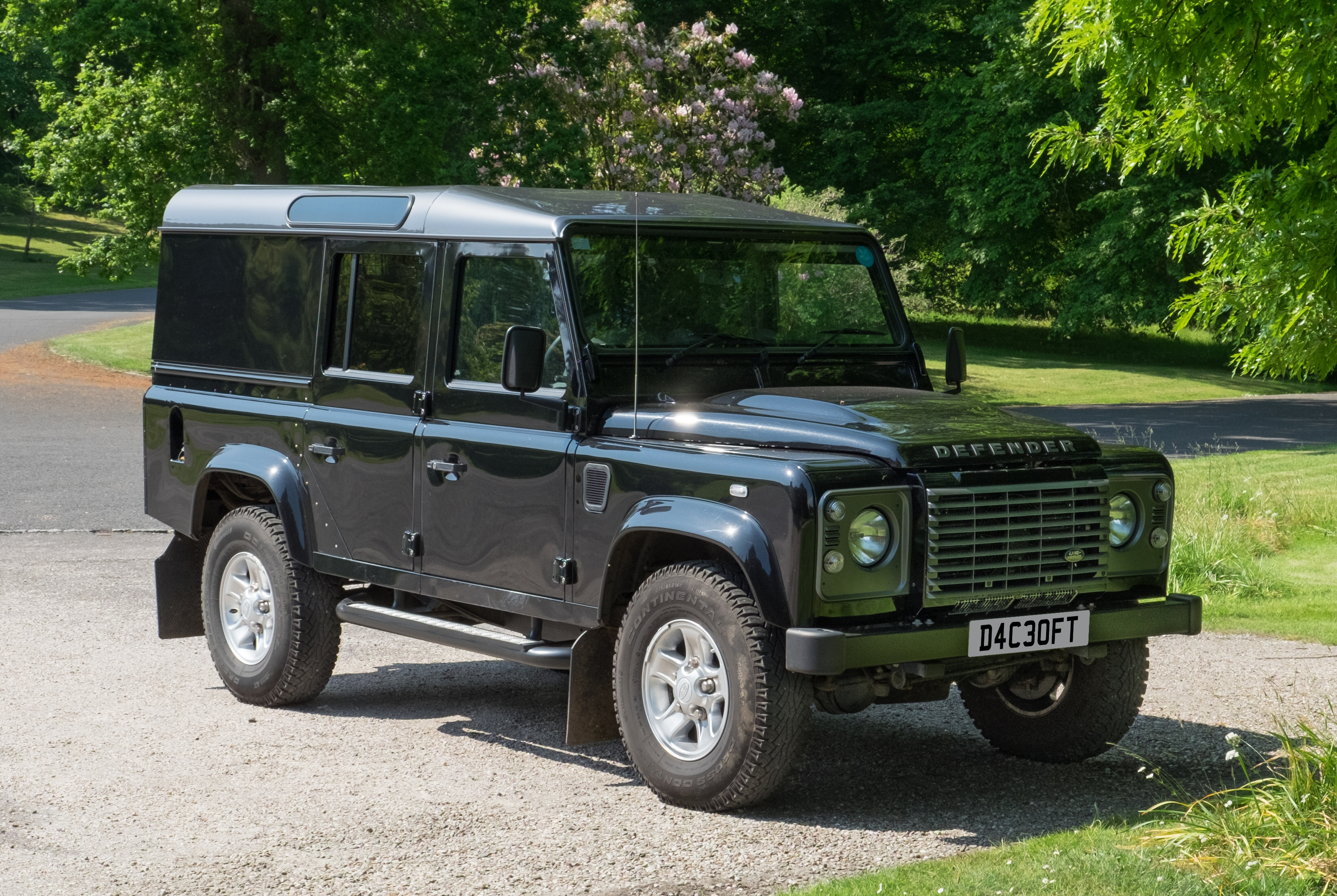
Land Rover Defender

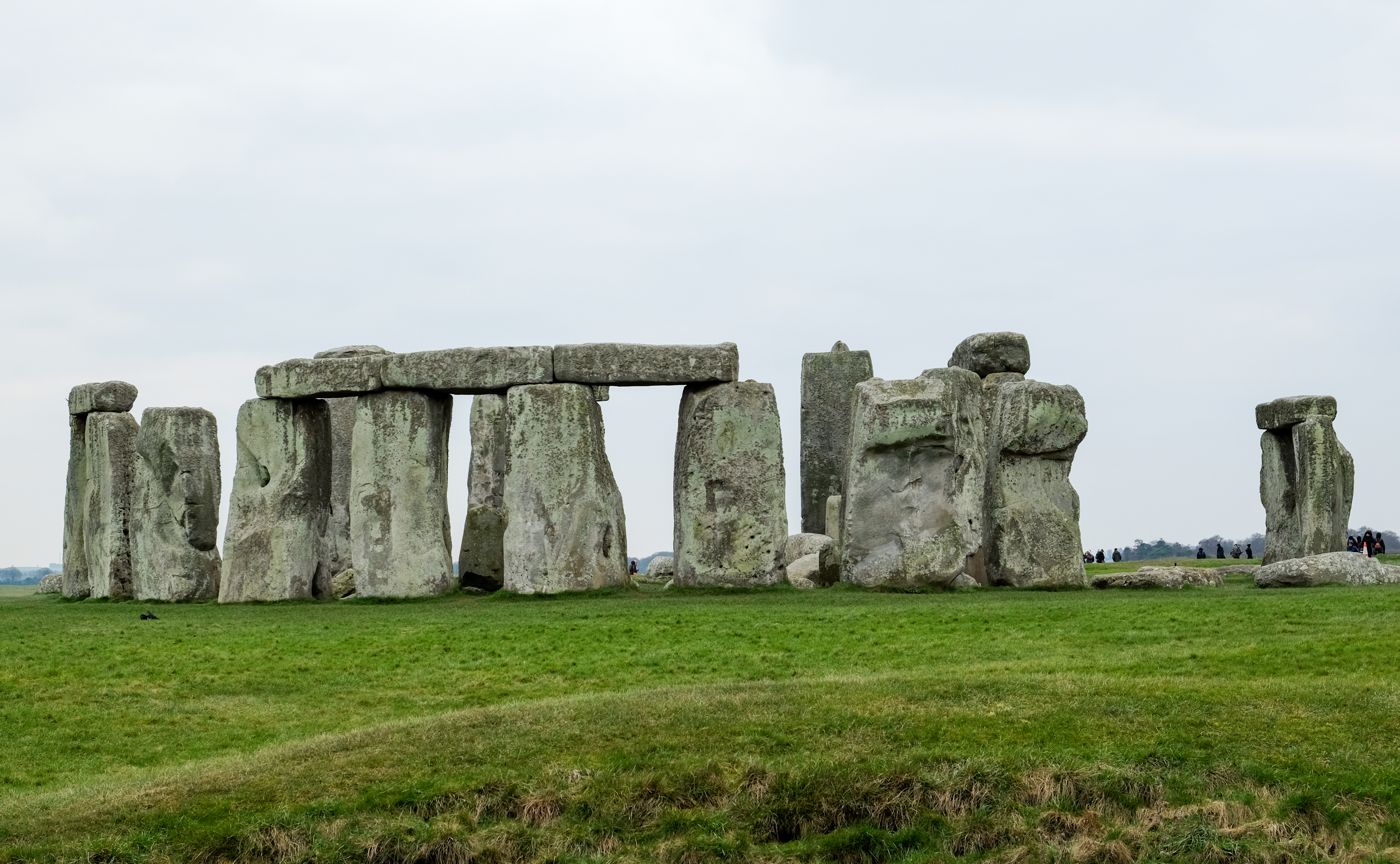
Stonehenge

==== United Kingdom icons ====
- AEC Routemaster red double-decker bus
- Baked beans
- Basil Fawlty
- The Beano
- The Beatles
- Big Ben chimes
- Black Cab (hackney cab)
- Boudica
- Bowler hat
- Britannia
- British Monarchy
- Britpop
- British Rail
- British Bulldog
- Cap of Maintenance
- A Clockwork Orange
- Cool Britannia
- Concorde
- Coronation Street
- Crossroads
- Crown Jewels of the United Kingdom
- Cutty Sark
- Dad's Army
- Doctor Who
- Dig for Victory
- EastEnders
- England expects that every man will do his duty
- Excalibur
- Excalibur (comics)
- Fawlty Towers
- The Few, "..so much owed by so many to so few"
- Fish and chips
- Football (soccer)
- Frank Spencer
- Full breakfast: Full English, Ulster fry, Scottish, Welsh
- Gentleman's Relish
- God Save the King
- The Great Escape
- Hackney carriage
- Harry Potter
- HP sauce
- Hyacinth Bucket
- InterCity 125
- The Italian Job
- Jaffa Cakes
- James Bond
- John Bull
- King Arthur
- Land of Hope and Glory
- Land Rover Defender
- Last Night of the Proms
- The Lion and the Unicorn
- Lonsdale Belt
- The Lord of the Rings
- Marks & Spencer
- Marmite
- Mini
- Miniskirt
- Miss Marple
- Mod
- Monty Python
- Morrissey
- Page Three girl
- Pantomime
- Pint glass
- Police box
- Pub
- Punk
- King's Guard
- RMS Queen Mary
- Red Arrows
- Red post boxes
- Red telephone boxes
- Robin
- Rolls-Royce Motor Cars
- Royal Warrant
- Rule Britannia
- Rugby
- The Sex Pistols
- Sherlock Holmes
- Skinhead
- Special Air Service (SAS)
- Sten
- Suffragettes
- Supermarine Spitfire
- Swinging Sixties
- Tea (cup of)
- Tea (meal)
- Test Card F
- Thunderbirds
- Tommy Atkins (generic name for a British soldier)
- Brodie helmet (helmet worn by the above)
- Trooping the Colour
- Twiglets
- Umbrella
- Union Flag
- Weather
- We shall never surrender, ..fight them on the beaches speech
- Wallace & Gromit
- Wellington boot
- Winston Churchill
- Woolworths Group plc

==== English icons ====
- 1966 World cup squad
- And did those feet in ancient time
- Angel of the North
- Bangers and mash
- The Boat Race
- Clapham Junction
- Cricket
- Del Boy
- Dixon of Dock Green
- EastEnders
- English rose
- Full English breakfast
- Jack the Ripper
- King Arthur
- London Bridge
- London Eye
- M25 motorway
- Morris dance
- Only Fools and Horses
- Oxbridge
- Premier League
- Robin Hood
- Saint George's Cross
- Soho
- Spaghetti Junction
- Status Quo
- Stilton cheese
- Stonehenge
- There'll Always Be an England
- Three Lions
- Tower Bridge
- Tube map
- Tudor rose
- Yeoman
- Yeomen Warders
- White Cliffs of Dover

==== Northern Irish icons ====
- Carrickfergus Castle
- Free Derry
- George Best
- Giant's Causeway
- Glens of Antrim
- H-Blocks
- Harland and Wolff
- Hurling, administered by Ulster GAA
- Mourne Mountains
- Saint Patrick's Day

==== Scottish icons ====
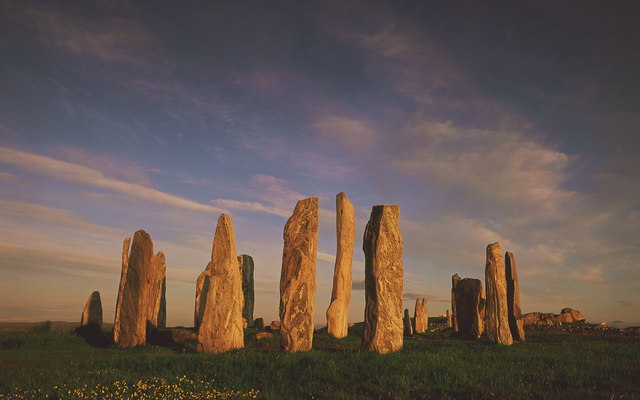
Callanish Stones

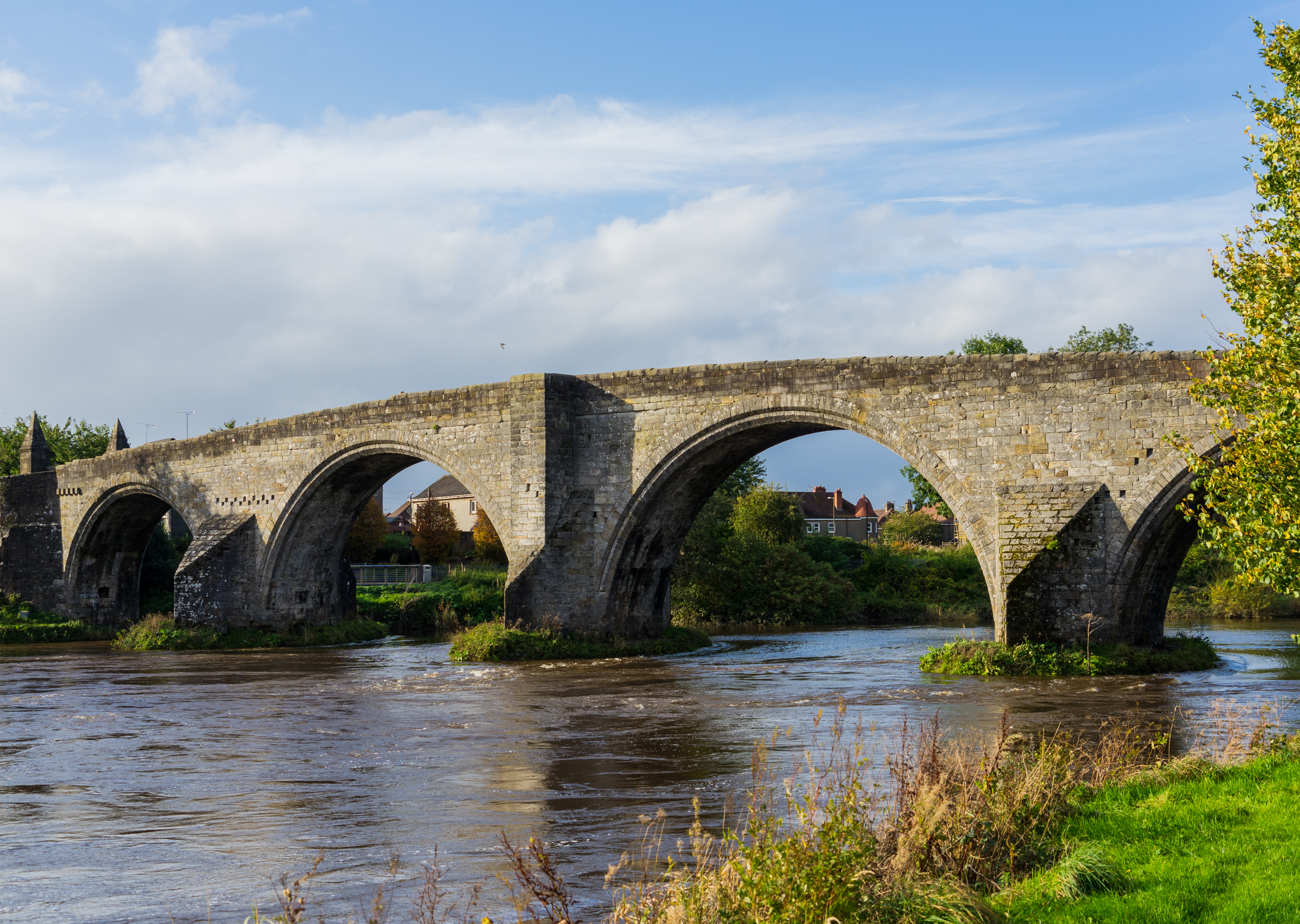
Stirling Old Bridge

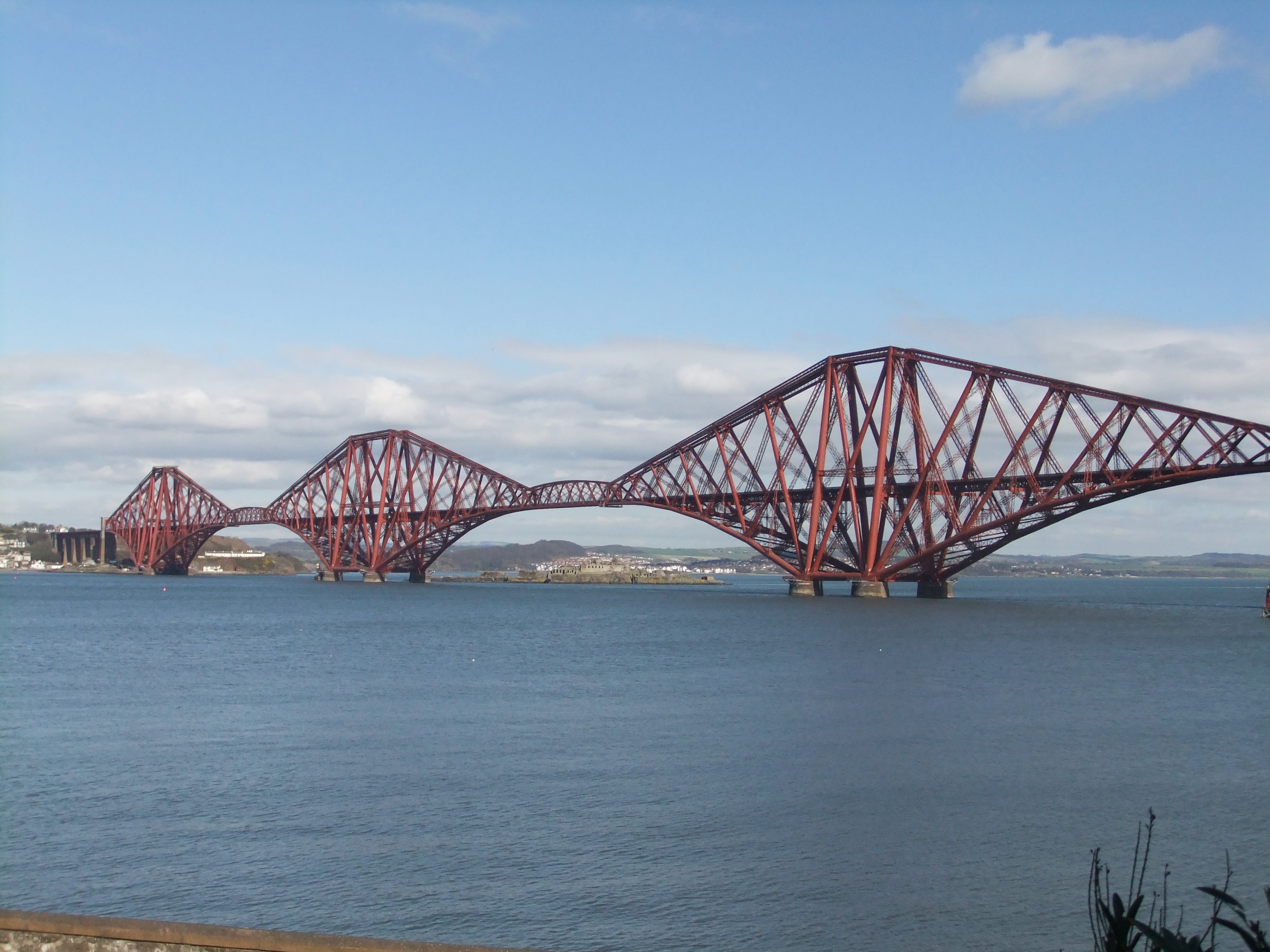
Forth Bridge

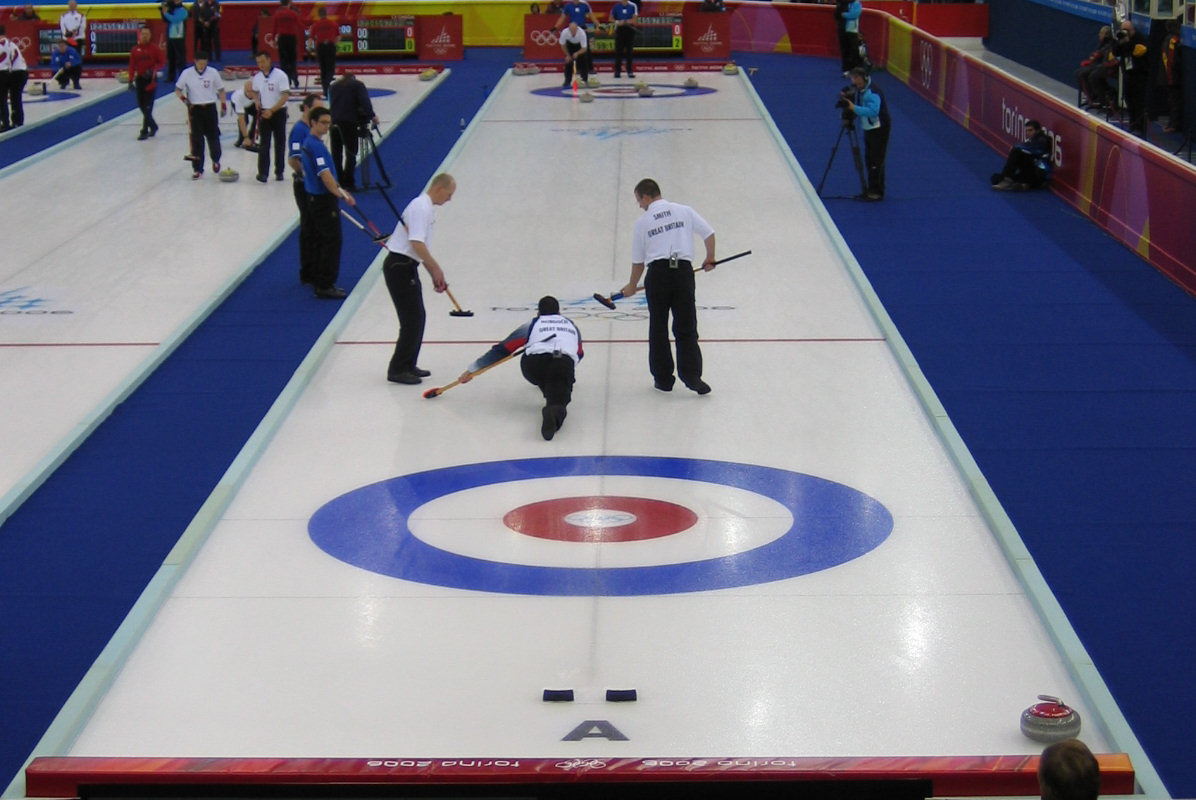
Curling

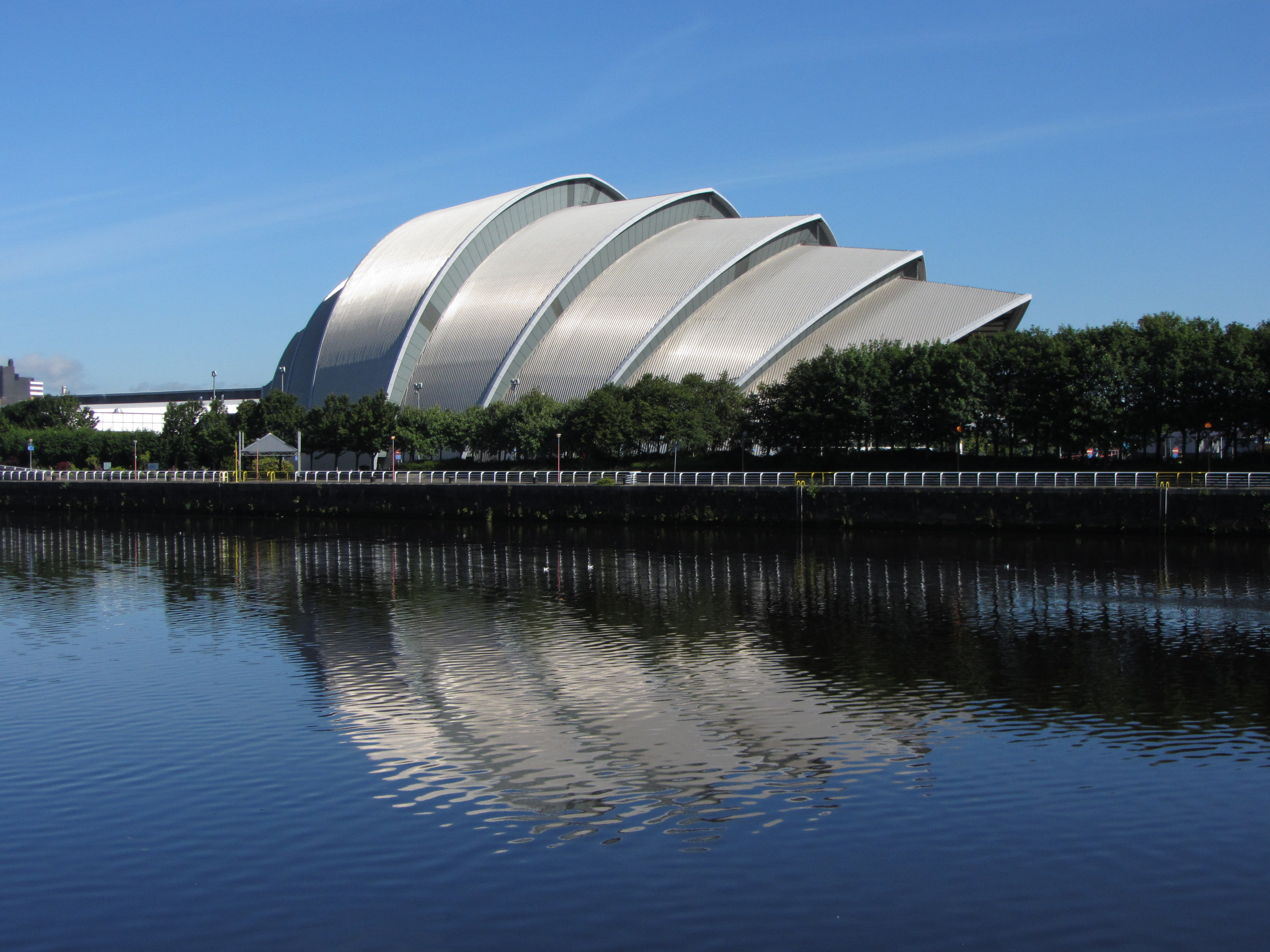
SEC Armadillo

- Alex Ferguson
- Armadillo
- Alexander Fleming
- Auld Lang Syne
- Bagpipes
- Bank of Scotland
- Bannockburn
- Ben Nevis
- Billy Connolly
- Callanish Stones
- Common riding
- Curling
- Dundee cake
- Edinburgh Castle
- Eilean Donan Castle
- Flower of Scotland
- Forth Bridge
- Full Scottish breakfast
- Great Highland bagpipe
- Golf
- Hackle
- Haggis (with neeps and tatties)
- Highland games
- Hogmanay
- John Logie Baird
- Kilt
- Loch Lomond
- Loch Ness
- Old Firm
- Oatcake
- Porridge
- Rab C. Nesbitt
- Robert the Bruce
- Robert Burns
- St Andrew's Cross
- Scotch whisky
- Scotland the Brave
- Scottish Premiership
- Scots Wha Hae
- Sgian-dubh
- Shinty
- Shortbread
- Stirling Old Bridge
- Stirling Castle
- Still Game
- Tam o' shanter
- Tartan
- Thistle
- The Kelpies
- Trews
- Tweed (cloth)
- Unicorn
- Up Helly Aa
- William Wallace

==== Welsh icons ====
- Bryn Terfel
- Cymraeg (Welsh language)
- Daffodil
- Eisteddfod inc. National Eisteddfod of Wales
- Land of my Fathers
- Laver bread
- Leek
- Rhondda Valley
- Rugby union in Wales
- Tom Jones (singer)
- Welsh Dragon
- Welsh rarebit
- Welsh hat

=== Languages ===
Languages of the United Kingdom

- English Language
  - English dialects
    - British English
    - Regional accents of English speakers
    - English language in England
    - Scottish English
    - Welsh English
    - Ulster English
    - Hiberno-English
  - Comparison of American and British English
  - Oxford English Dictionary
- Celtic languages
  - Welsh
  - Scots Gaelic
  - Irish language in Northern Ireland
    - Ulster Irish
  - Cornish
  - Manx
- Scots in Scotland and Ulster
- British Sign Language (BSL)
- Romany
- Indian, Pakistani and Bangladeshi languages
  - Gujarati
  - Telugu
  - Tamil
  - Hindi
  - Punjabi
  - Urdu
  - Bengali

=== People ===
Demographics of the United Kingdom

- British people
  - Lists of Britons
- English people
  - List of English people
- People of Northern Ireland
- Scottish people
  - List of Scots
- Welsh people
  - List of Welsh people
- Cornish people
  - List of Cornish people
- List of people commemorated by blue plaques

==== Interest groups and societies ====
- British Professional Bodies
- Women's Institute
- List of UK learned societies
- List of gentlemen's clubs in London
- Pressure groups in the United Kingdom
  - Fathers' rights movement in the UK

=== Religion ===
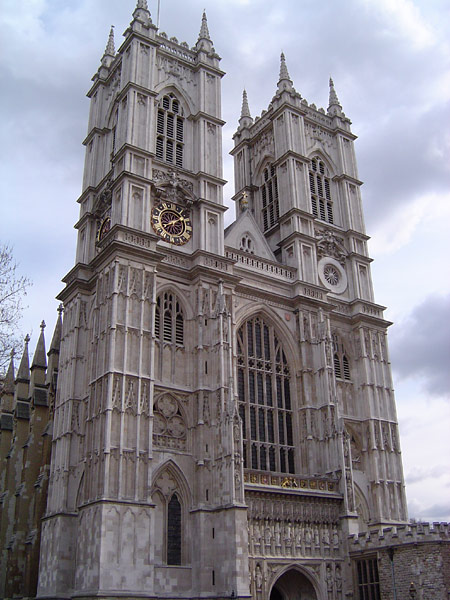
Westminster Abbey is used for the coronation of British monarchs.

Religion in the United Kingdom

- Religion in England
- Religion in Northern Ireland
- Religion in Scotland
- Religion in Wales
- Christianity
  - Assemblies of God in Great Britain
  - Church of England (the established church in England)
  - Church of Scotland (the national church of Scotland)
  - Church of Ireland
  - Church in Wales
  - Episcopal Church of Scotland
  - Free Church of Scotland (post 1900)
  - Free Church of Scotland (Continuing)
  - Free Presbyterian Church of Ulster
  - Reformed Presbyterian Church of Ireland
  - Reformed Presbyterian Church of Scotland
  - Presbyterian Church of Ireland
  - Presbyterian Church of Wales
  - General Assembly of Unitarian and Free Christian Churches
  - Methodism
  - Open Brethren
  - Non-subscribing Presbyterian Church of Ireland
  - Roman Catholic Church in England and Wales
  - Roman Catholic Church in Scotland
  - Coptic Orthodox Church in Britain and Ireland
  - United Reformed Church
  - Religious Society of Friends (Quakers)
  - The Church of Jesus Christ of Latter-day Saints
- Hinduism in the United Kingdom
  - Hinduism in England
  - Hinduism in Northern Ireland
  - Hinduism in Scotland
  - Hinduism in Wales
- Islam in the United Kingdom
  - Islam in England
  - Islam in Northern Ireland
  - Islam in Scotland
  - Islam in Wales
- Judaism
  - History of the Jews in England
  - History of the Jews in Scotland
- Sikhism in the United Kingdom
  - Sikhism in England
  - Sikhism in Scotland
- Buddhism in the United Kingdom
  - Buddhism in England
  - Buddhism in Scotland
- Druidism
- Other
  - Atheism/ Irreligion
  - Jedi
  - Scientology in the United Kingdom
  - Status of religious freedom in the United Kingdom

=== Sports, games, and pastimes ===
Sport in the United Kingdom The following are the major sports; local groups may well play many others.

==== Angling ====
- National Federation of Anglers
- National Federation of Sea Anglers
- Salmon and Trout Association

==== Chess ====
- English Chess Federation
- Scottish Chess Championship

==== Cricket ====
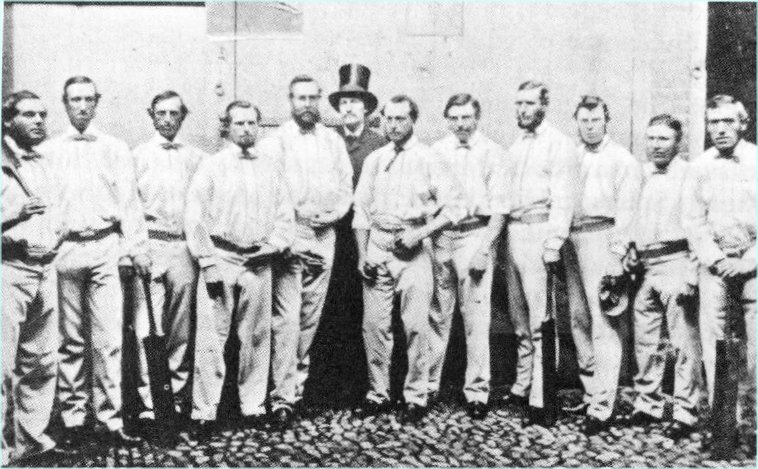
The first England team to tour Southern Australia

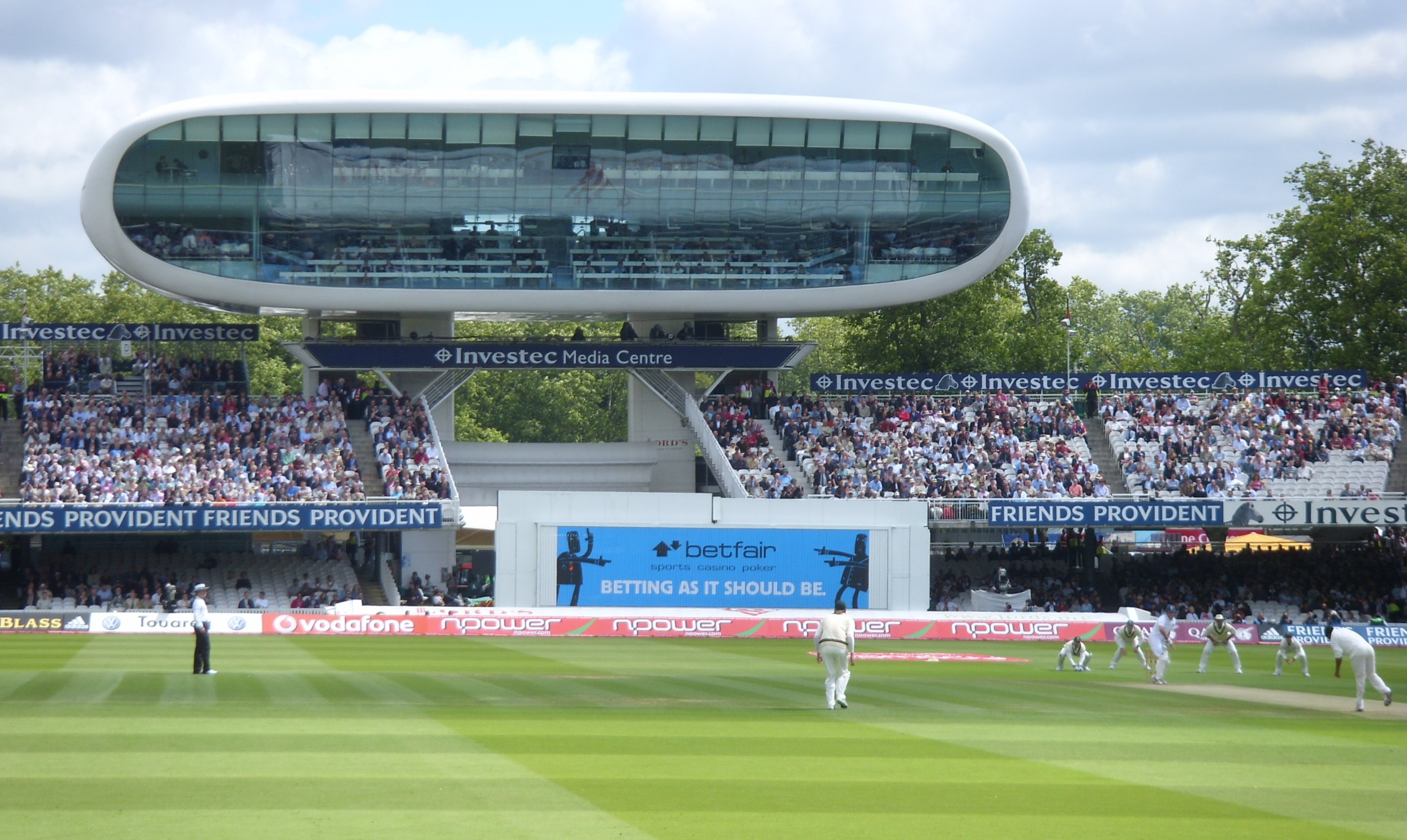
The media centre at Lord's Cricket Ground

- Cricket in England
  - 2005 English cricket season
  - England cricket team
  - Marylebone Cricket Club
  - County cricket
- Cricket in Scotland
  - Scotland national cricket team
- Cricket in Wales
  - England cricket team
  - Wales national cricket team
- Cricket in Ireland
  - Ireland cricket team

==== Hiking ====
- Long-distance footpaths in the UK
- Ramblers' Association

==== Association football ====
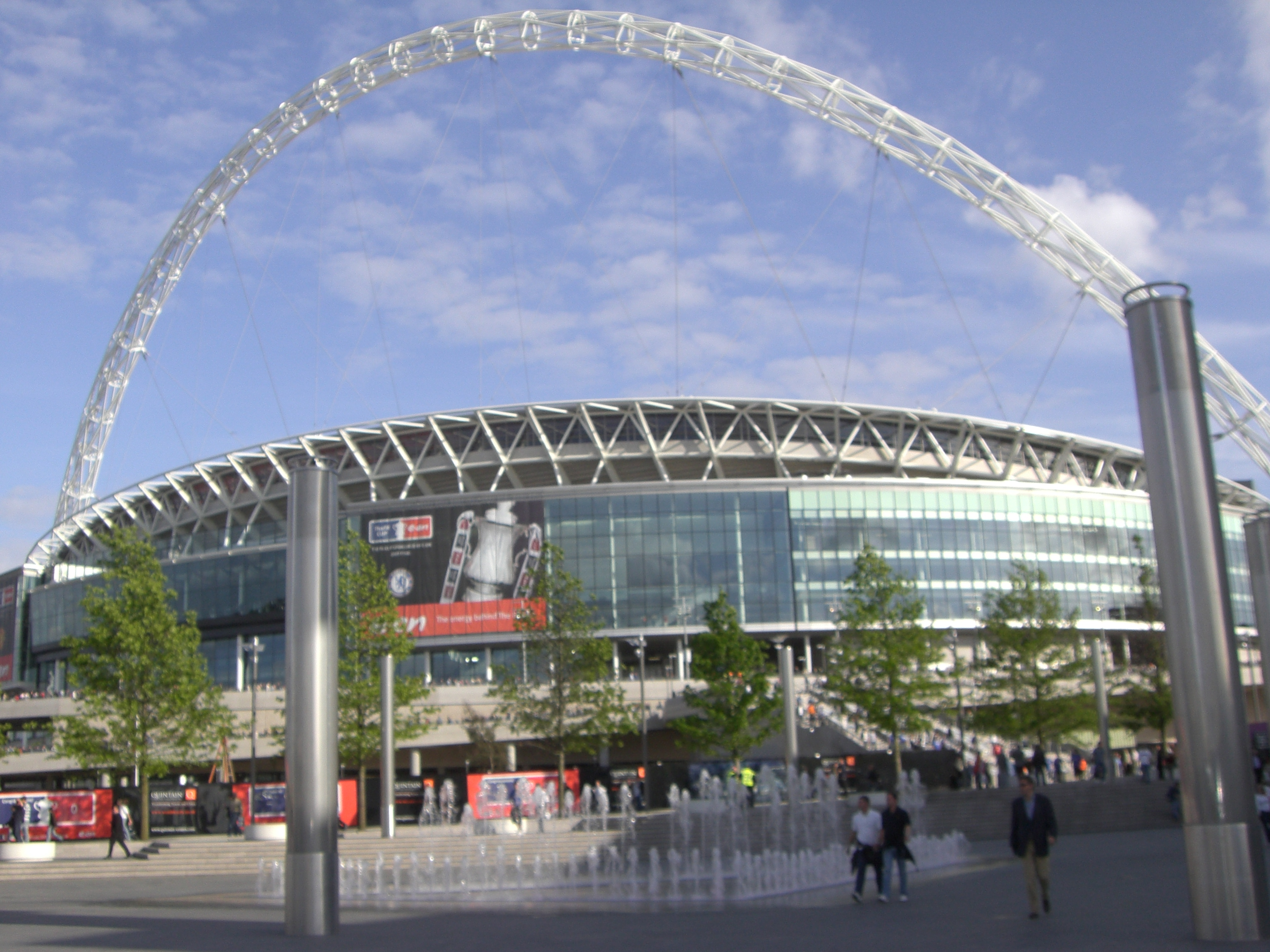
Wembley Stadium exterior

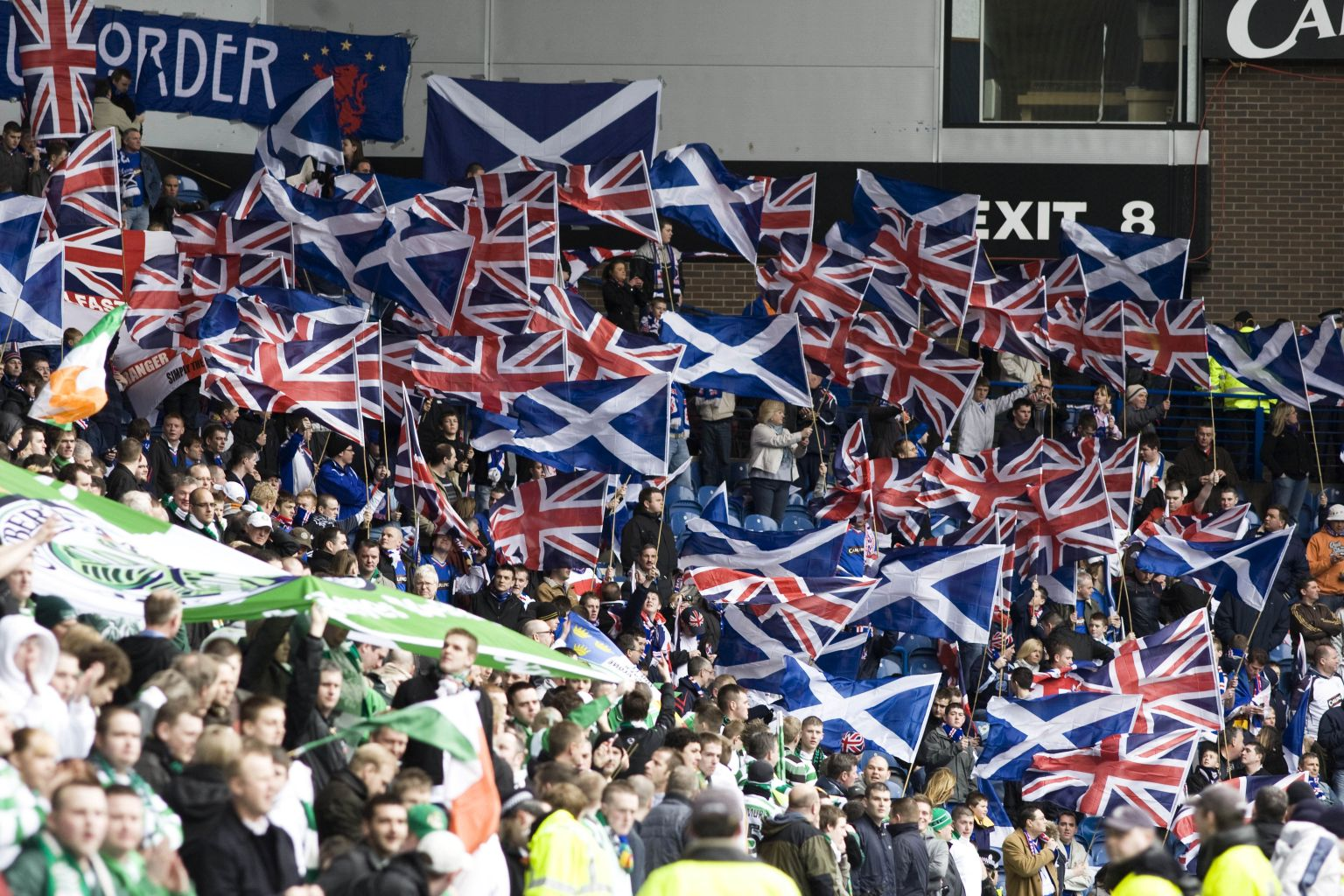
The Old Firm derby

- British Home Championship
- England
  - The Football Association
  - England national football team
  - FA Premier League
  - The Football League
  - FA Cup
  - English football league system
  - National League System
- Scotland
  - Scottish Football Association
  - Scotland national football team
  - List of Scottish Football Clubs
  - Scottish Football League
  - Scottish Premiership
  - Highland Football League
  - East of Scotland Football League
  - South of Scotland Football League
  - Scottish Junior Football Association
  - North Caledonian Football League
  - Scottish Cup
- Northern Ireland
  - Irish Football Association (not to be confused with the Football Association of Ireland)
  - Northern Ireland national football team
  - Irish Football League (not to be confused with the League of Ireland)
- Wales
  - Football Association of Wales
  - Wales National Football Team
  - League of Wales

==== Polo ====
- Hurlingham Polo Association

==== Rugby ====
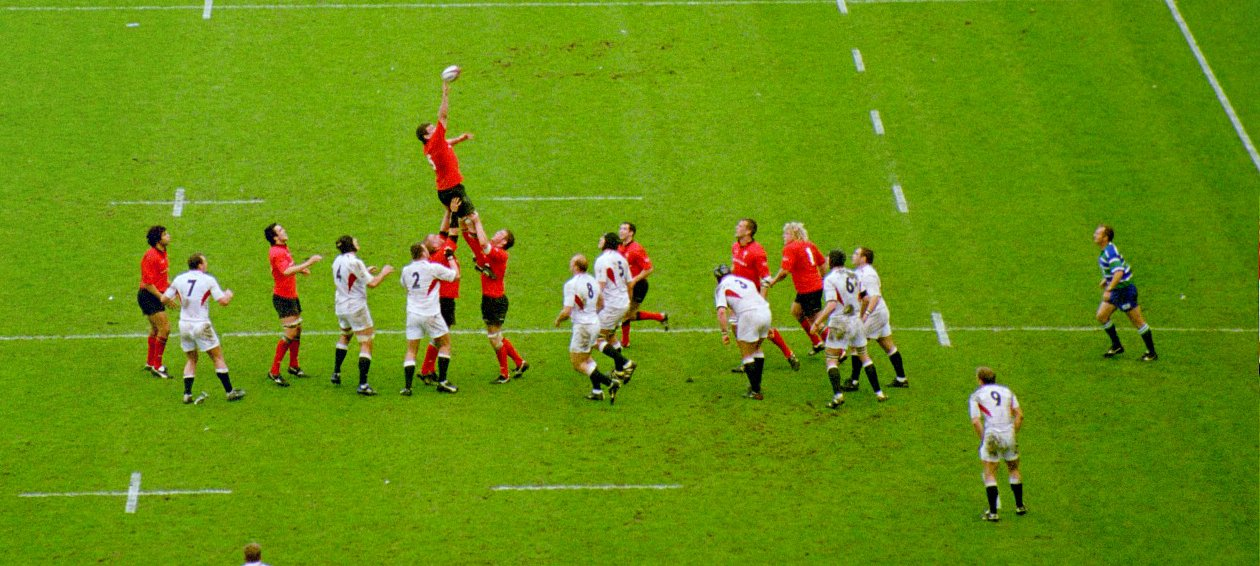
England playing Wales in the Six Nations

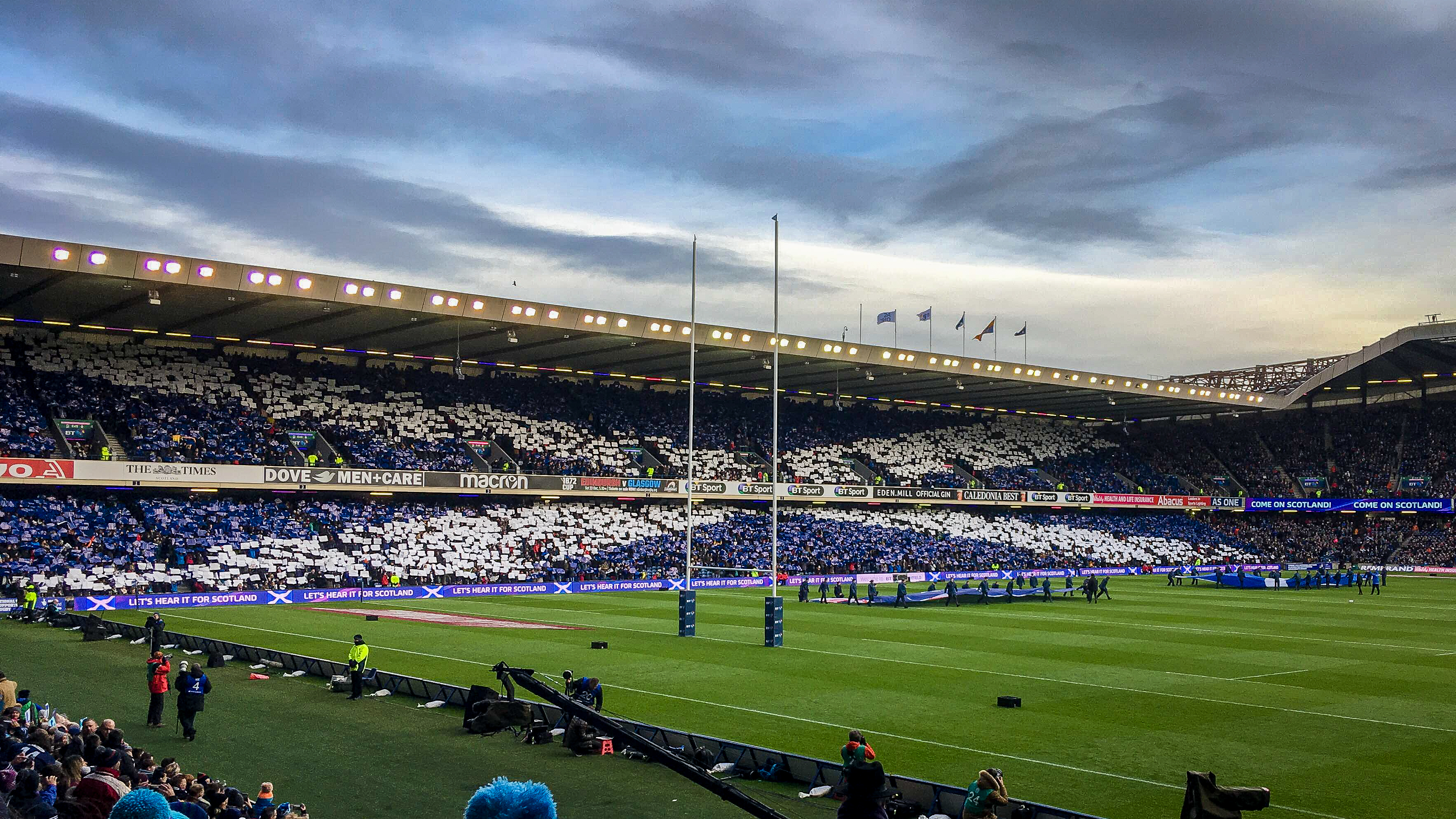
Murrayfield Stadium, home of the Scotland national rugby union team

- Rugby union
  - England
    - Rugby Football Union
      - England national rugby union team
      - Guinness Premiership
      - National Division One
  - Wales
    - Welsh Rugby Union
      - Wales national rugby union team
      - Pro14
      - Welsh Premier Division
  - Scotland
    - Scottish Rugby Union
      - Scotland national rugby union team
      - Pro14
  - Northern Ireland
    - Irish Rugby Football Union
      - Ireland national rugby union team
      - Pro14
  - Calcutta Cup
  - Powergen Cup
  - British and Irish Lions
- Rugby league
  - England
    - Rugby Football League
  - Northern Ireland
    - Rugby League Ireland
  - Scotland
    - Scotland Rugby League
  - Wales
  - Great Britain
  - Challenge Cup

==== Sport rowing ====
- Boat Race (Oxford vs Cambridge)
- Henley Royal Regatta

==== Skiing ====
- Ski Club of Great Britain

==== Other sports, games, and pastimes ====
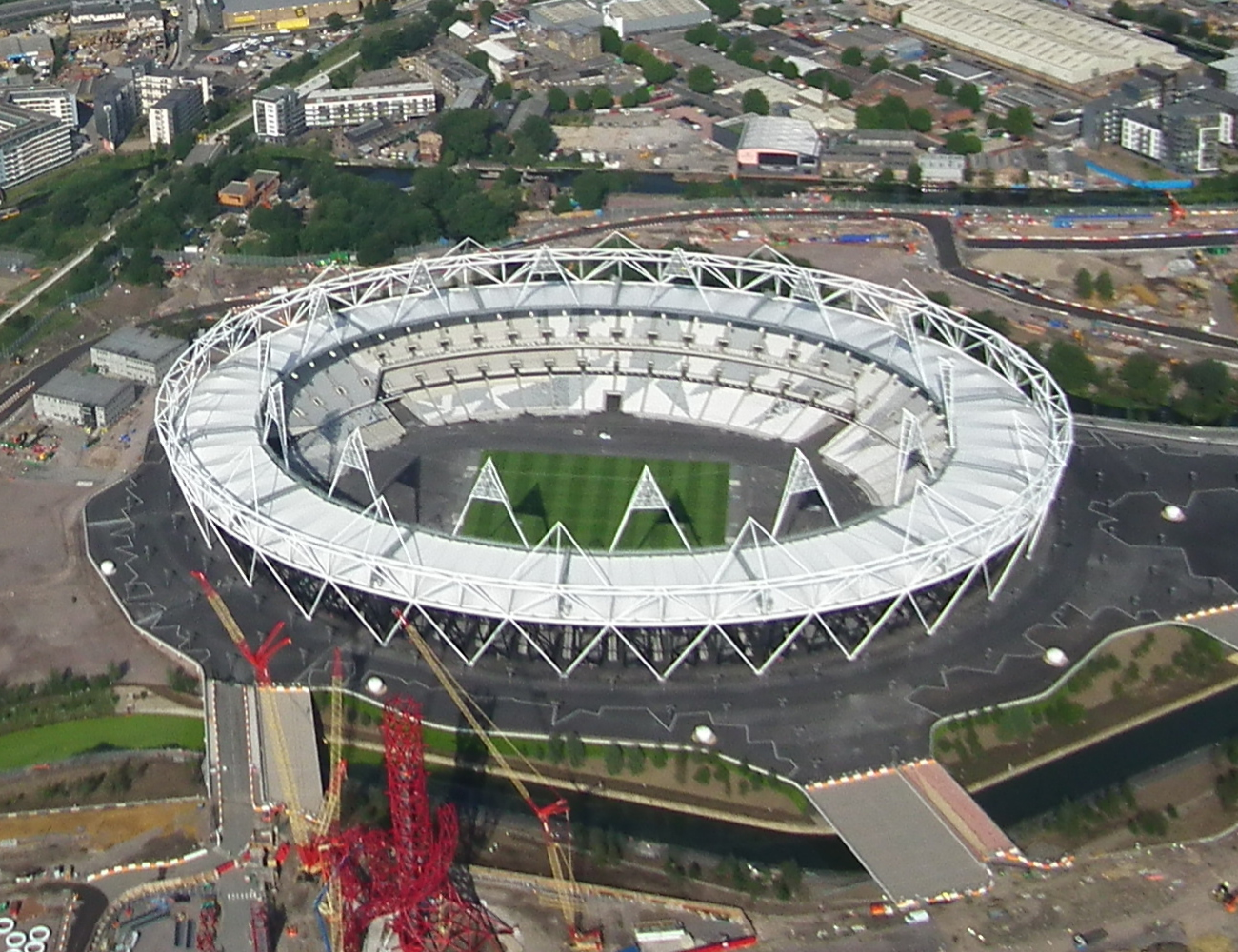
Olympic Stadium in June 2011

- London Olympics (disambiguation)
- Bowls
- Curling
- Darts
- English billiards
- Eton Wall Game
- Fives (including Eton Fives)
- British Gliding Association
- Horse racing in Great Britain
- Lawn tennis
- Shinty
- Skittles
- Snooker
- Motorsport

== Education ==
- Education in the United Kingdom
  - Schools in the United Kingdom
    - Preparatory school
    - Grammar schools in the United Kingdom
    - Private schools in the United Kingdom
    - List of schools in the United Kingdom
    - School years
  - Universities in the United Kingdom
    - British undergraduate degree classification
    - List of universities in the United Kingdom
    - National Union of Students of the United Kingdom

=== Education in England ===
- Education in England

- Academy (England)
- General Teaching Council for England
- List of schools in England
- List of universities in England
- National Curriculum for England

=== Education in Northern Ireland ===
- Education in Northern Ireland

- List of schools in Northern Ireland
- Northern Ireland Curriculum

=== Education in Scotland ===
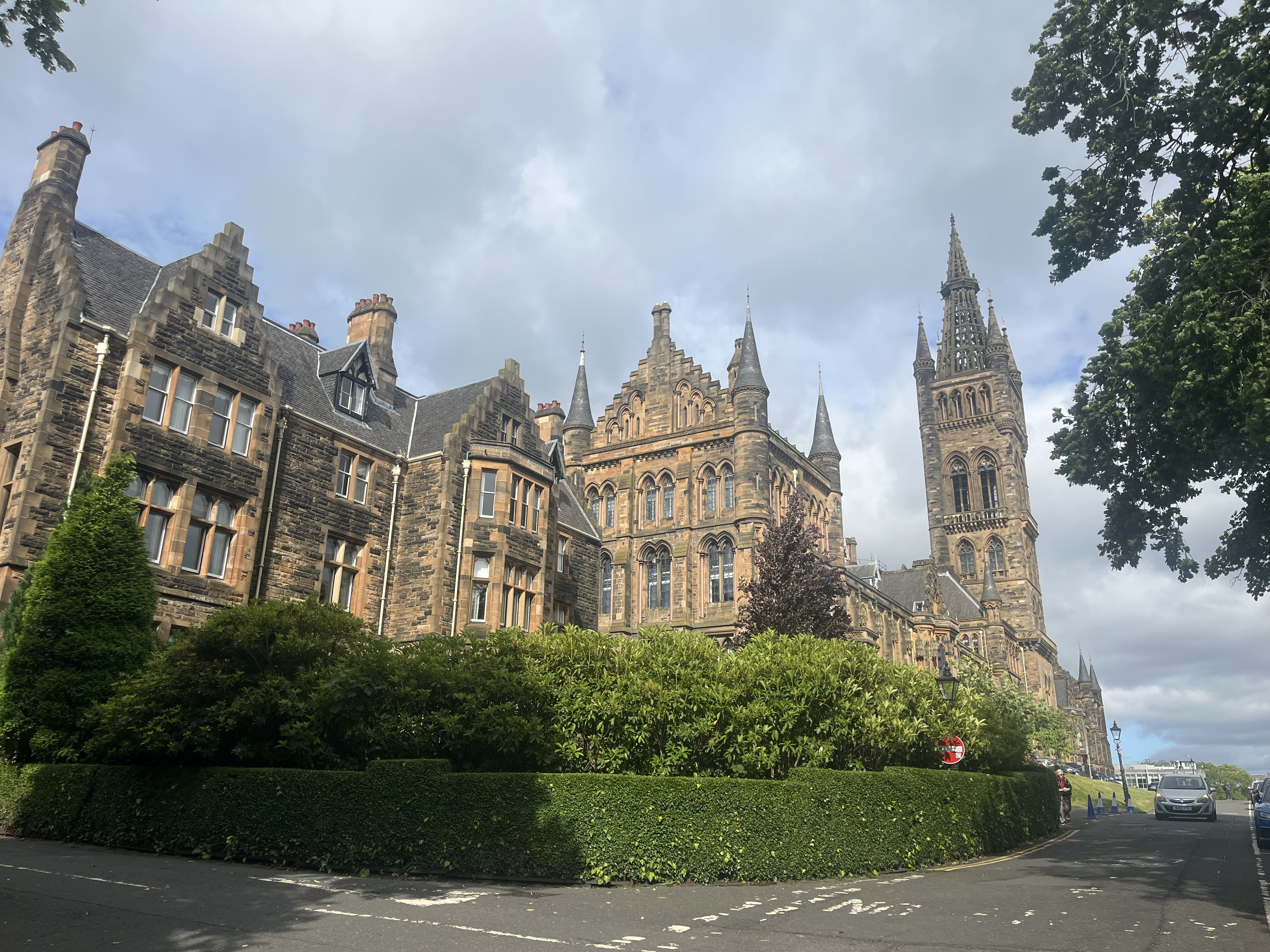
University of Glasgow

- Education in Scotland

- Curriculum for Excellence
- Educational Institute of Scotland
- General Teaching Council for Scotland
- His Majesty's Inspectorate of Education
- Education Scotland
- List of schools in Scotland
- List of private schools in Scotland
- List of universities in Scotland
- Students' representative council
- Scottish Secondary Teachers' Association
- Scottish Qualifications Authority

=== Education in Wales ===
- Education in Wales

- List of schools in Wales
- National Curriculum for Wales

== See also ==
- List of international rankings
- Member states of the Commonwealth of Nations
- Member states of the North Atlantic Treaty Organization
- Member states of the United Nations
- Outline of Europe
- Outline of geography
