= Feral parrot =

Parrot in non-native environment

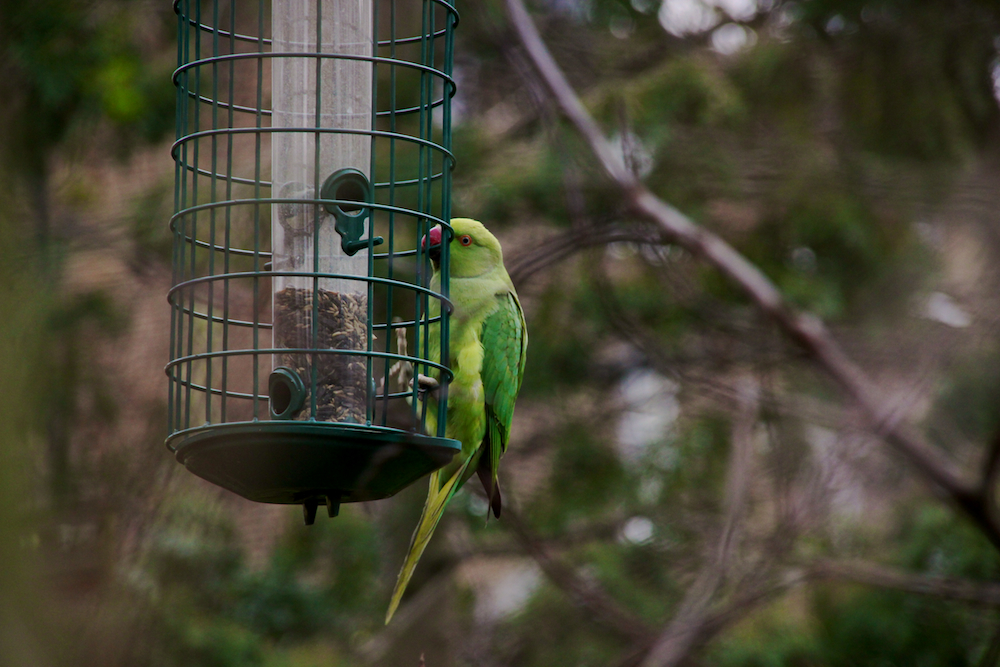
Feral rose-ringed parakeet, Psittacula krameri on a bird feeder in Wimbledon, London

A feral parrot is a parrot that has adapted to life in an ecosystem to which it is not native. The birds are often descended from pets that have escaped or been deliberately released. Many species of parrots are highly social, and like to gather in large flocks. Not all feral parrots are able to adapt to life outside of captivity, although having a pre-existing nearby parrot colony can assist with the adaptation process.

Feral parrots may become invasive species that affect native biodiversity, human economy and wellness. They are present in many countries worldwide.

== Parrots living in non-native environments ==
=== Rainbow lorikeet ===
Native to the eastern seaboard of mainland Australia, several feral colonies of rainbow lorikeets (Trichoglossus haematodus) have been established in Perth, Western Australia, Tasmania, and Auckland, New Zealand. They are considered to be an invasive species as they outcompete native birds for food and nest hollows, carry disease and can breed prolifically, producing up to three broods of eggs in one breeding season. Native threatened species such as the stitchbird and kākā in New Zealand and the swift parrot in Tasmania may be at risk of contracting diseases from or being outcompeted by the invasive lorikeets. They also pose an economic threat to the horticultural industry as they damage soft fruits such as grapes and apples.

=== Eastern rosella ===
The eastern rosella (Platycercus eximius) has become naturalized in the North Island of New Zealand.

=== Rose-ringed parakeet ===
Native to India, Sri Lanka and parts of Africa, sizeable populations of naturalized rose-ringed parakeets (Psittacula krameri) exist around the world. They can be found in England, the Netherlands, Belgium and along the river Rhine in Germany. The largest UK roost of these is thought to be in Esher, Surrey, numbering several thousand. Feral rose-ringed parakeets also occur in the United States, South Africa, Egypt (resident, breeding all over Giza territory in June), Israel (with many seasonally present in Yarkon Park in North Tel Aviv), Lebanon, UAE and Oman. There are also several populations in Istanbul, Turkey, both on the European side where they can be seen in Gülhane Park, Yıldız Park and Eyüp, and on the Anatolian side. It can also be found in Japan.

In Hawaii, the rose-ringed parakeet is invasive.

=== Other ===
Also found in the United States are various naturalized Brotogeris species, mainly B. versicolurus (canary-winged parakeet) and B. chiriri (yellow-chevroned parakeet). Myiopsitta monachus (Monk parakeet) are found in some coastal areas of the East Coast from Florida to coastal Connecticut, in parts of the lower Great Lakes near Chicago, and in parts of Texas. A population of naturalized peach-faced lovebirds (Agapornis roseicollis) is found in Phoenix, Arizona.

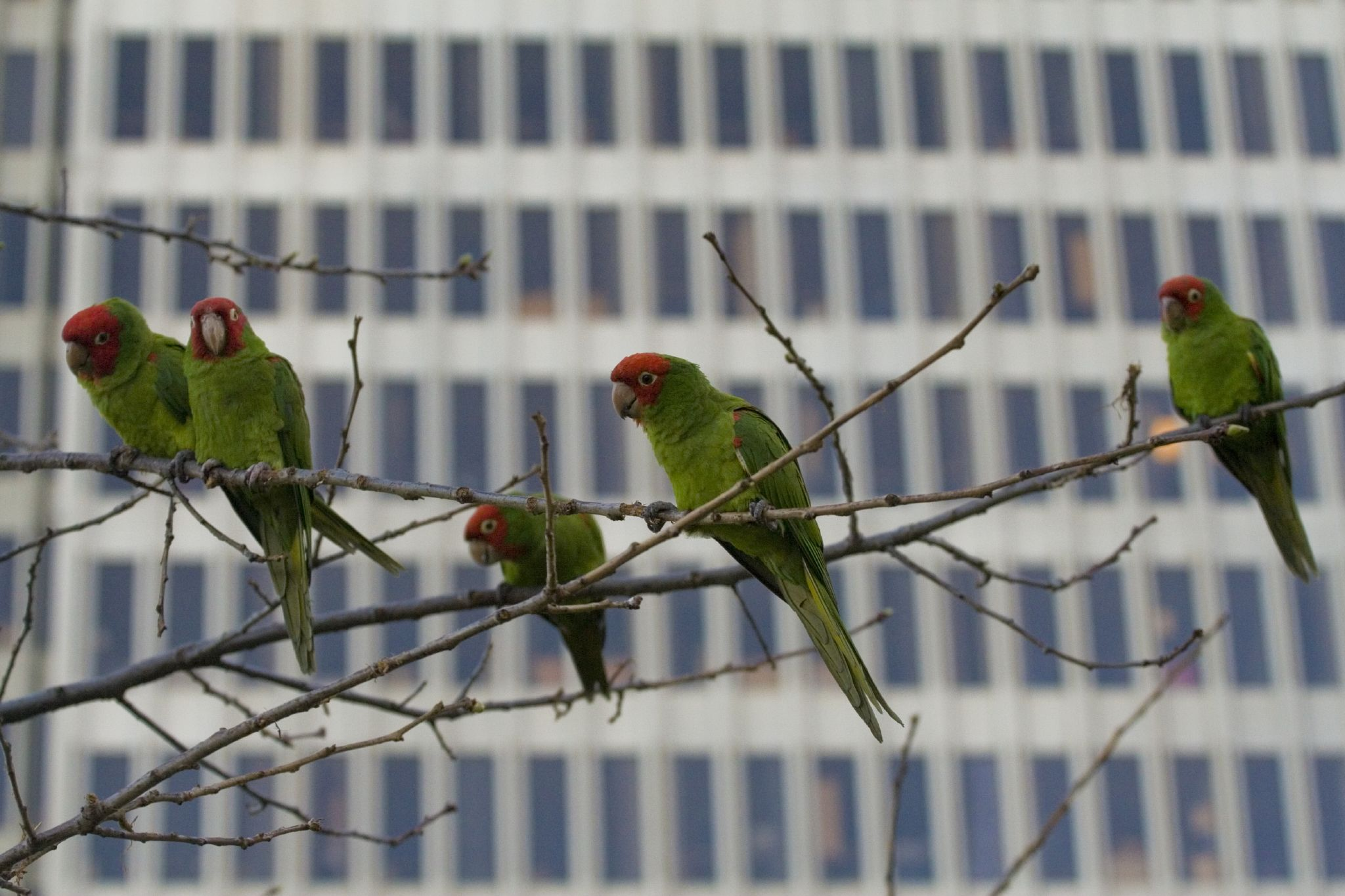
The population of red-masked parakeets that have gone feral in San Francisco have become famous through a book and film that have been made about them.

Several species, including red-lored parrots (Amazona autumnalis), lilac-crowned parrots (Amazona finschi) and yellow-chevroned parakeets (Brotogeris chiriri), have become well established in Southern California, and in San Francisco's Telegraph Hill area there is a population of mainly red-masked or cherry-headed parakeets, a female mitred parakeet (and thus several inter-specific hybrids), as depicted in the documentary The Wild Parrots of Telegraph Hill. In the greater San Francisco Bay Area, there are several populations of red-masked parakeets, including in Palo Alto, Menlo Park, and Sunnyvale.

A breeding population of the blue-and-yellow macaw (Ara ararauna), has been present in east-central Miami-Dade County, Florida since the mid-1980s. They are often sighted in the city of Miami in parks, and are a frequent visitor to University of Miami campus and Fairchild Tropical Botanic Garden in Coral Gables, Florida.

The Belmont Heights District in Long Beach, California, is also known to have many species of feral parrots, which have become local icons to the citizens of the area. They are known for their loud noises as well as their large communities. These parrots can be found roosting mostly on Ocean Boulevard between Livingston Drive and Redondo Avenue in palm trees.

The San Gabriel Valley in California has a large non-indigenous population of naturalized parrots. According to the Parrot Project of Los Angeles, the parrots are of at least five species. Residents have come to enjoy the birds as part of their city's culture, and like other Southern California residents they have become "local icons" to the citizens there. Many theories surround the mystery of how the parrots landed in Pasadena and claimed the area as their home. A widely accepted story is that they were part of the stock that were set free for their survival from the large pet emporium at Simpson's Garden Town on East Colorado Boulevard, which burned down in 1959.

Malibu, California has populations of black hooded or Nanday Parakeet (Nandayus nenday), lilac crowned amazon parrots (Amazona finschi), red-crowned amazon parrots (Amazona viridigenalis), and mitred parakeets (Aratinga mitrata).

The orange-winged amazon (Amazona amazonica) has been introduced to Tenerife in the Canary Islands, where it has been observed successfully hybridizing with a feral scaly-headed parrot (Pionus maximiliani) and also attempting to breed with feral monk parakeet (Myiopsitta monachus) and rose-ringed parakeet (Psittacula krameri), even involving itself in the former species' unusual nest-building behaviour.

== Lists of feral parrot species by continent ==
=== North America ===
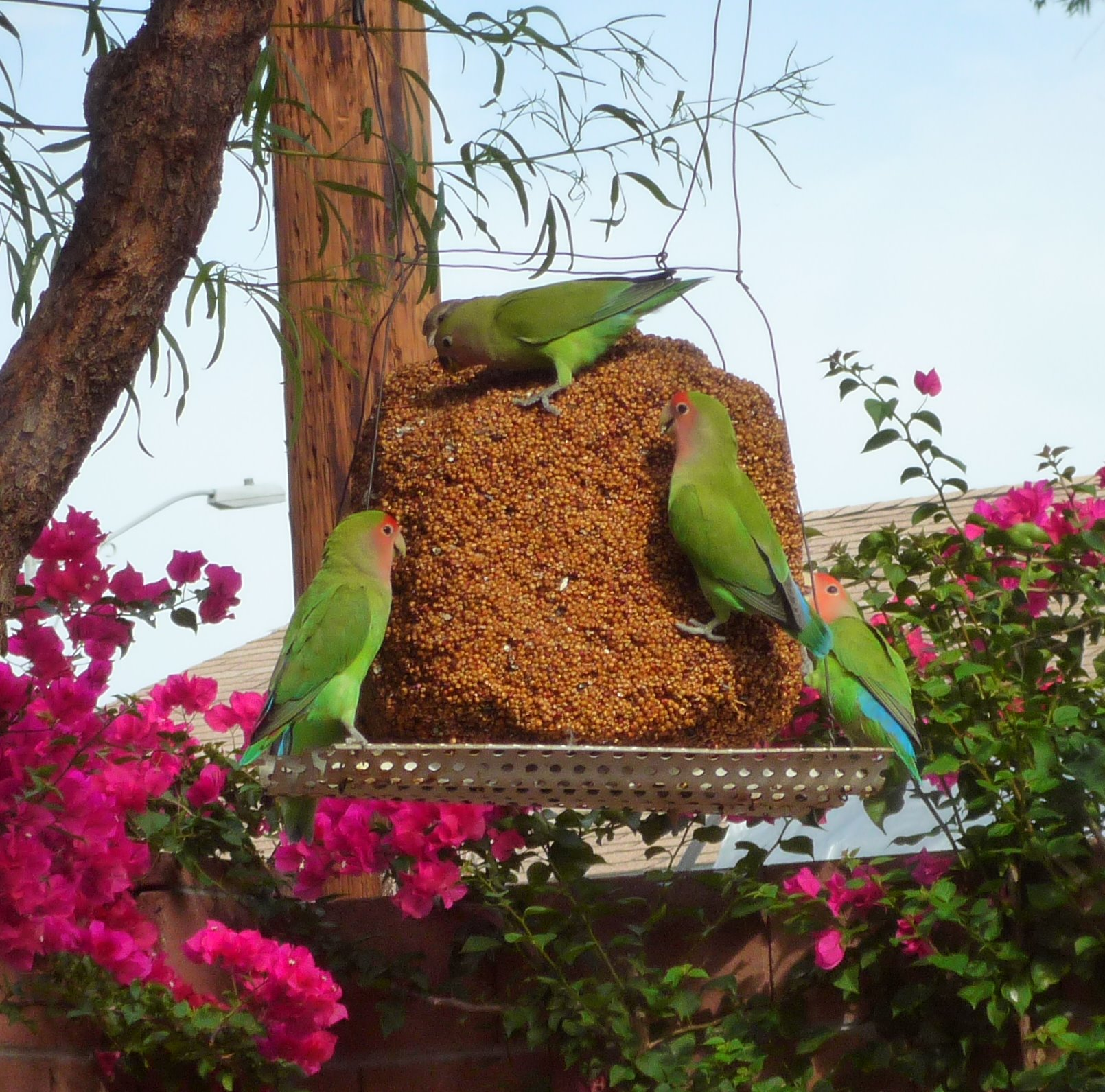
Feral peach-faced lovebirds eating seeds from a garden feeder in Scottsdale, Arizona

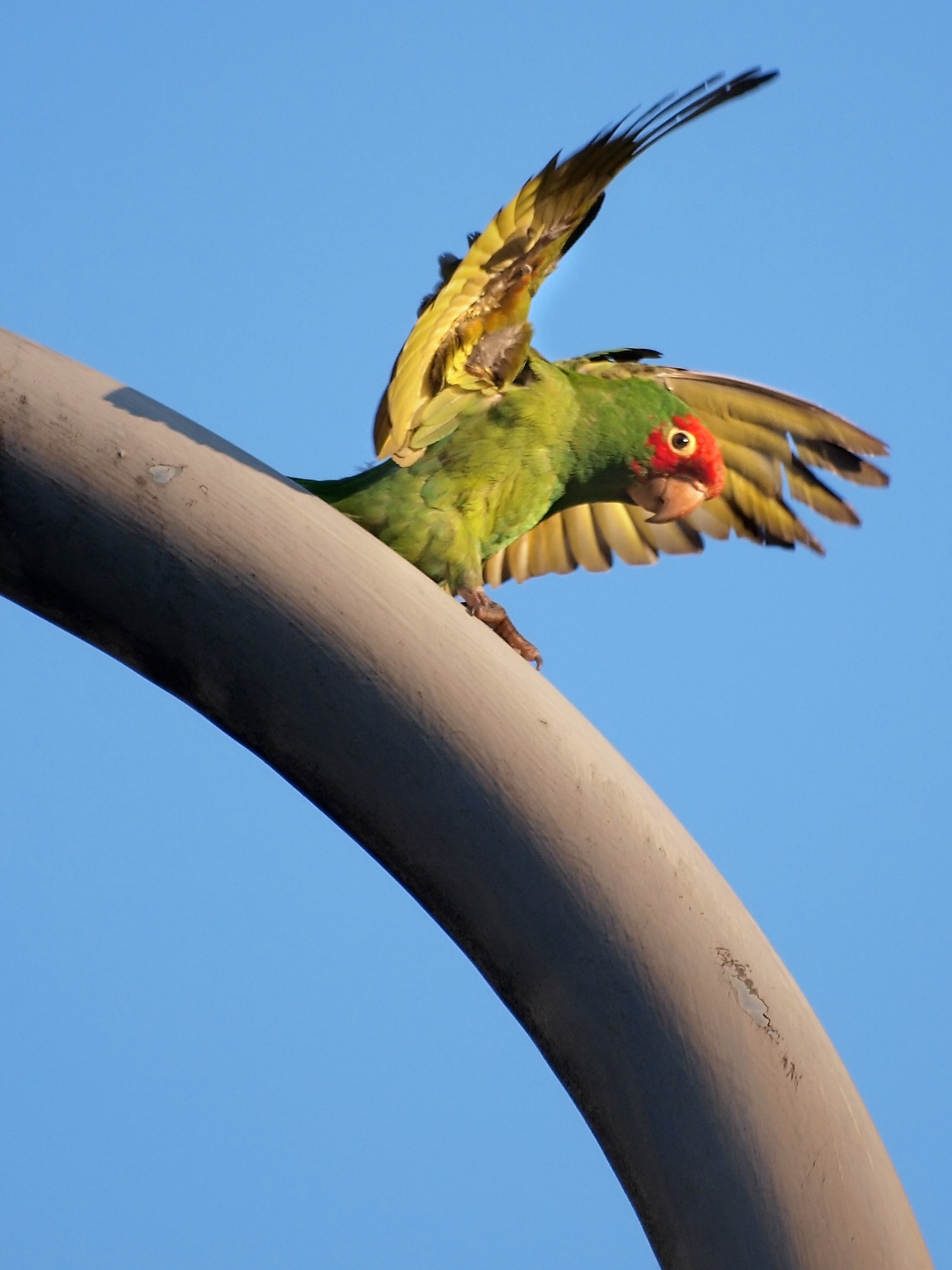
A red-masked parakeet in San Francisco, California

- Budgerigar - Melopsittacus undulatus
- Peach-faced lovebird - Agapornis roseicollis
- Blue-and-yellow macaw - Ara ararauna
- Chestnut-fronted macaw - Ara severus
- Mitred parakeet - Psittacara mitratus
- Blue-crowned parakeet - Thectocercus acuticaudatus
- Yellow-chevroned parakeet - Brotogeris chiriri
- Red-masked parakeet - Psittacara erythrogenys
- Nanday parakeet - Aratinga nenday
- Rose-ringed parakeet - Psittacula krameri
- Monk parakeet - Myiopsitta monachus
- Canary-winged parakeet - Brotogeris sp.
- Spectacled amazon - Amazona albifrons
- Red-lored amazon - Amazona autumnalis
- Blue-fronted amazon - Amazona aestiva
- Lilac-crowned amazon - Amazona finschi
- Yellow-headed amazon - Amazona oratrix
- Red-crowned amazon - Amazona viridigenalis

=== South America ===
Note: Species found as introduced to the State of Rio de Janeiro, outside their historical ranges; further research can detect other species in other regions.

- Jenday conure - Aratinga jandaya
- Monk parakeet - Myiopsitta monachus
- Blue-fronted amazon Amazona aestiva

=== Europe ===
- Alexandrine parakeet - Psittacula eupatria
- Fischer's lovebird - Agapornis fischeri
- Monk parakeet - Myiopsitta monachus
- Orange-winged amazon - Amazona amazonica
- Rose-ringed parakeet Psittacula krameri
- Scaly-headed parrot - Pionus maximiliani
- Yellow-headed amazon - Amazona oratrix
- Senegal parrot - Poicephalus senegallus

=== Africa ===
- Rose-ringed parakeet - Psittacula krameri

=== Oceania ===
==== New Zealand ====
- Rainbow lorikeet - Trichoglossus moluccanus
- Eastern rosella - Platycercus eximius
- Crimson rosella - Platycercus elegans
- Sulphur-crested cockatoo - Cacatua galerita
- Galah - Eolophus roseicapilla

=== Asia ===
- Sulphur-crested cockatoo - Cacatua galerita
- Yellow-crested cockatoo - Cacatua sulphurea
- Coconut lorikeet - Trichoglossus haematodus
- Red-breasted parakeet - Psittacula alexandri

==== Middle East ====
- Rose-ringed parakeet - Psittacula krameri

== Causes ==
Feral parrot flocks can be formed after mass escapes of newly imported, wild-caught parrots from airports or quarantine facilities. Large groups of escapees have the protection of a flock and possess the skills to survive and breed in the wild. Some feral parakeets may have descended from escaped zoo birds.

Escaped or released pets rarely contribute to establishing feral populations. Escapes typically involve only one or a few birds at a time, so the birds do not have the protection of a flock and often do not have a mate. Most captive-born birds do not possess the necessary survival skills to find food or avoid predators and often do not survive long without human caretakers. However, in areas where there are existing feral parrot populations, escaped pets may sometimes successfully join these flocks.

The most common era or years that feral parrots were released to non-native environments was from the 1890s to the 1940s, during the wild-caught parrot era.

In the psittacosis "parrot fever" panic of 1930, "One city health commissioner urged everyone who owned a parrot to wring its neck. People abandoned their pet parrots on the streets."

== See also ==
- Feral parakeets in Great Britain
- The Wild Parrots of Telegraph Hill
- Feral chicken
- Feral pigeon
