= The Wild Parrots of Telegraph Hill =

- Directed by: Judy Irving
- Produced by: Judy Irving
- Starring: Mark Bittner; Judy Irving (uncredited)
- Cinematography: Judy Irving
- Edited by: Judy Irving
- Music by: Chris Michie
- Distributed by: Shadow Distribution Inc.
- Release dates: October 9, 2003 (Austin Film Festival); February 11, 2005 (United States)
- Running time: 83 minutes
- Country: United States
- Language: English

The Wild Parrots of Telegraph Hill is a 2003 documentary film directed, produced, and edited by Judy Irving. It chronicles the relationship between Mark Bittner, an unemployed musician who lives rent-free in a cabin in the Telegraph Hill neighborhood of San Francisco, and a flock of feral parrots that he feeds and looks after. Bittner also wrote a memoir about his experiences with the parrots, which shares the title of the documentary, but has the added subtitle: A Love Story...with Wings.

In May 2007, the documentary aired on the PBS series Independent Lens.

== Summary ==
Much of the film focuses on the parrots and their individual personalities and relationships with one another and Bittner. The flock is composed primarily of cherry-headed conures, but there is one lonely blue-crowned conure. Some San Francisco residents share the different stories they have heard about the possible origins of the flock.

Bittner tells his story as well. He had come down to San Francisco from Seattle to be a musician, but, after giving up on that dream, found himself directionless. Although he would occasionally do odd jobs, he mostly was more or less unemployed and homeless for many years, until he found some stability, thanks to a free place to stay, and purpose (and even minor celebrity), thanks to the relationship he developed with the parrots.

The later part of the film depicts Bittner's preparations to vacate his residence, which is about to undergo extensive renovations. He speaks to the city council about the parrots and finds a place to send the few birds that are unable to live with the flock, and so had been living with him. At the end, it is revealed that filmmaker, Judy Irving, and subject, Mark Bittner, began a relationship over the course of making the film.

== Production ==
Raising funding for the film was difficult at first, as Irving had to find individual donors, but the proceeds from a fundraiser at which Bittner gave a presentation to a packed theater allowed her to start shooting the film in earnest.

The musical score for the film was the final project by Chris Michie, a Bay area musician who was formerly the guitarist for Van Morrison, before his death from melanoma. The film, which Michie did not live to see released, is dedicated to him.

Bittner noted that there is humor in the piece, which he believes makes it different from many other nature documentaries.

== Awards ==
The film won the Genesis Award for Documentary Film and was nominated for the 2005 Satellite Award for Outstanding Documentary DVD.

== Aftermath ==
As is explained in the special features included on the DVD release of the film, about a year after Bittner left Telegraph Hill, he and Irving moved back to a house near his old one, and he reestablished his connection with the flock of parrots, which had grown some. Bittner and Irving were later married.

In 2007 the city of San Francisco instituted a ban on feeding the flock. The ban was supported by Bittner. In 2023, the San Francisco Board of Supervisors passed a resolution designating the conures as San Francisco's Official Animal. The species was chosen by a poll on Twitter, and barely beat out the California sea lion, best known locally as an attraction at Pier 39.

== San Francisco parakeet flock ==
According to Bittner, the term "The Wild Parrots of Telegraph Hill", while poetic, is a misnomer, and the flock ranges widely and is not centered on Telegraph Hill. Even in the area of San Francisco around Telegraph Hill, the place where the parakeets commonly nest and are most reliably seen is in Sue Bierman Park near the Ferry Building. Currently (as of 2024), feral parakeets are regularly seen in many of San Francisco's parks and into suburban areas as well.

In the 2020s, a collaborative research project between Mickaboo Companion Bird Rescue and several UCSF geneticists, titled the San Francisco Red Masked Parakeet Genetics Project, is studying the genetics and spread of this bird population. Among other findings, researchers have found that the birds are a mix of red-masked parakeets (Psittacara erythrogenys) and mitred parakeets (Psittacara mitratus) and form a unique hybrid.

== See also ==
- List of individual birds
