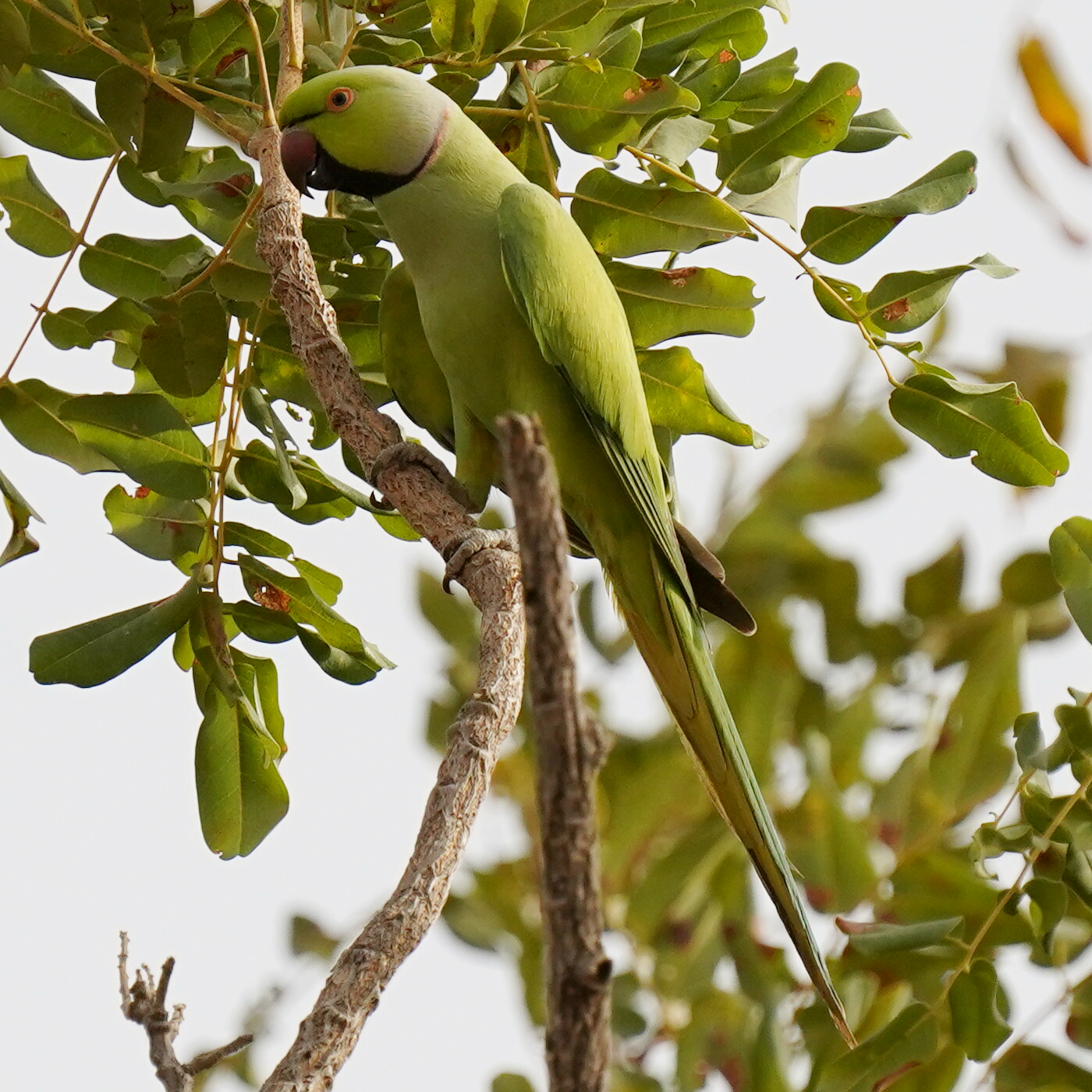
- Male P. k. krameri, Tendaba, Gambia
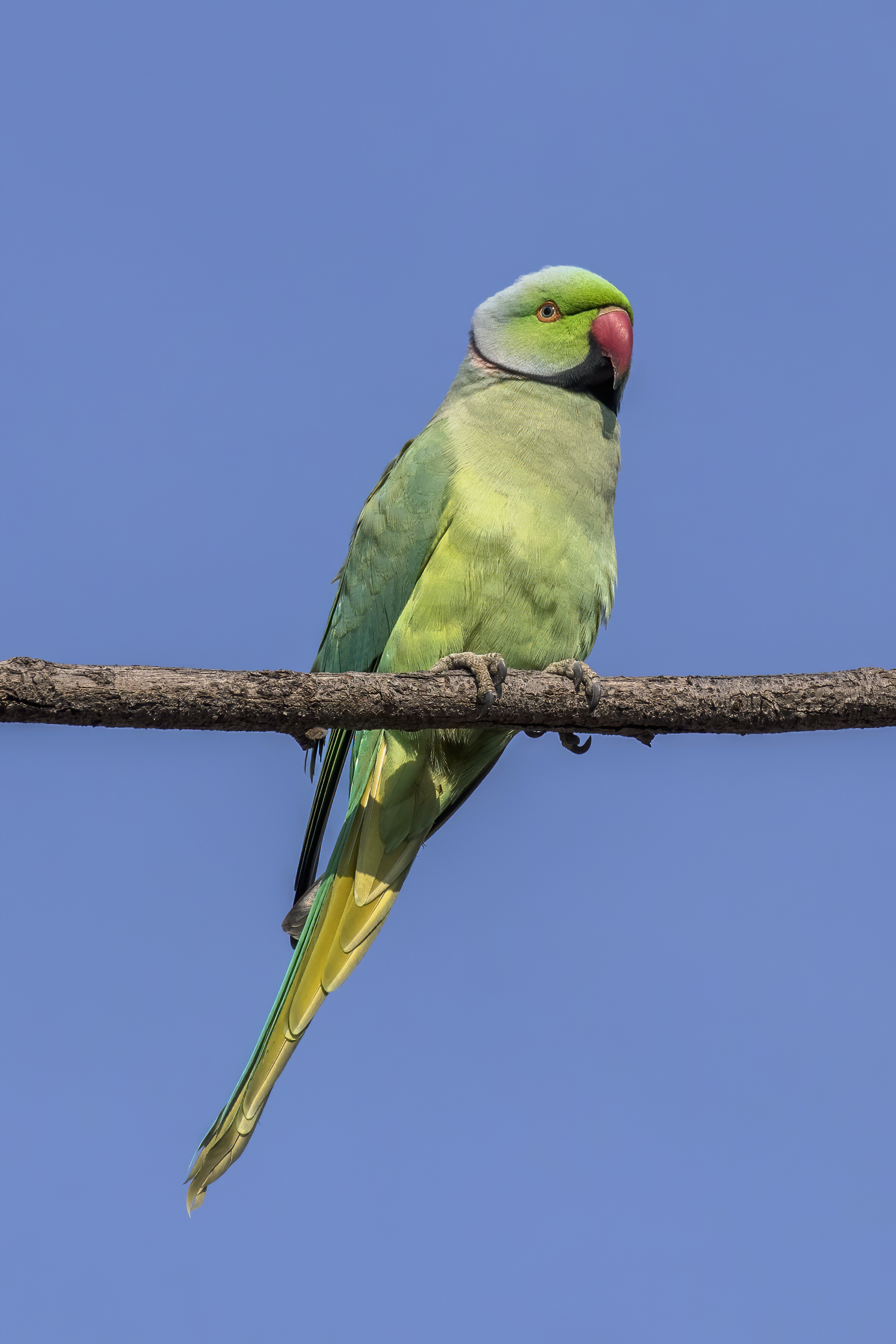
- Male P. k. borealis, Jaipur, India

Conservation status
- Least Concern (IUCN 3.1)

Scientific classification
- Kingdom: Animalia
- Phylum: Chordata
- Class: Aves
- Order: Psittaciformes
- Family: Psittaculidae
- Genus: Psittacula
- Species: P. krameri

Binomial name
- Psittacula krameri (Scopoli, 1769)
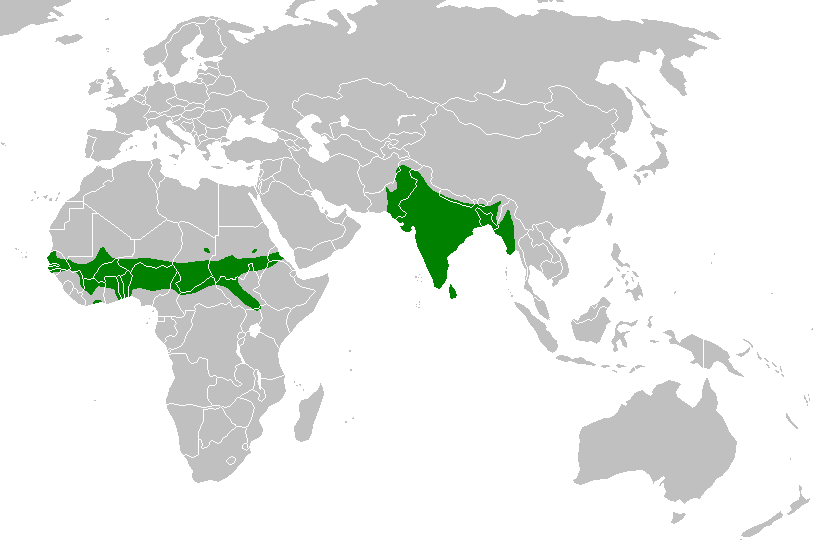
- Original (native) range

Synonyms
- Alexandrinus krameri

= Rose-ringed parakeet =

Rose-ringed parakeet or ring-necked parakeet

Species of bird

The rose-ringed parakeet (Psittacula krameri), also known as the ring-necked parakeet, or colloquially as the Indian Ringneck, is a medium-sized parrot in the genus Psittacula, of the family Psittaculidae. It has a disjunct native range in tropical northern Africa and the Indian subcontinent, and is now introduced into many other parts of the world where populations have established themselves having been bred for the exotic pet trade and then escaped.

The species is listed as least concern by the International Union for Conservation of Nature (IUCN) because its population appears to be increasing, but its popularity as a pet and unpopularity with farmers have reduced its numbers in some parts of its native range.

One of the few parrot species that have successfully adapted to living in disturbed habitats, it has withstood the onslaught of urbanisation and deforestation. As a popular pet species, escaped birds have colonised a number of cities around the world, including populations in northern and western Europe. They can live in a variety of climates outside their native range, and are able to survive low winter temperatures in northern Europe.

== Taxonomy ==
Four subspecies are recognised, with two in Africa and two in Asia. While they differ little in plumage, genetic evidence from studies in 2004, and 2016–2019, suggest they should probably be treated in two separate species, as the African and Asian populations are paraphyletic with respect to the Echo parakeet P. eques of Mauritius and (formerly) Réunion; the Asian populations are more closely related to P. eques than they are to African P. krameri. The subspecies differ in size, with the Asian birds being larger, and larger-billed, than the African; and most usefully for identification, in the pattern and tone of red and black on the bill.

Male	Female	Scientific name	English name	Distribution	Bill pattern
		P. k. krameri	African rose-ringed parakeet	West Africa in Guinea, Senegal, and southern Mauritania, east to western Uganda and southern Sudan, north to Egypt.	Upper mandible dark red with black tip; lower black with some red at the base
		P. k. parvirostris	Abyssinian rose-ringed parakeet	Northwestern Somalia, west across northern Ethiopia to Sennar state, Sudan	Upper mandible dark red with limited black tip; lower all-black
		P. k. borealis	Boreal rose-ringed parakeet	Northern Indian subcontinent north of 20°N, in Pakistan, northern India, Nepal, Bangladesh and northern and central Burma	Upper mandible bright red with no black; lower all-red or with some black markings
		P. k. manillensis	Indian rose-ringed parakeet	Southern India south of 20°N, Sri Lanka	Upper mandible bright red sometimes with black on the tip; lower black

The feral and naturalised populations in Great Britain, Germany and Spain, and likely those worldwide, in Australia, much of Europe, the United States, and other Western countries, are derived from an interbreeding mixture of P. k. manillensis and P. k. borealis; there is no evidence of any African origin birds being naturalised in Britain, despite these being known to have featured in the birds imported for the cagebird trade. Escaped individual P. k. krameri in Germany have failed interbreed with feral P. k. manillensis / P. k. borealis, preferring instead to try breeding with other even less related parrots. It is also suggested that the Asian populations are better adapted to survival in the cooler climates where most feral birds are.

The 2016–2019 genetic study suggested creating the new genus Alexandrinus for this species and the Echo parakeet, with three species, A. eques, A. manillensis (including A. m. borealis), and A. krameri (including A. k. parvirostris). Some organisations, including the IUCN, have accepted this new genus (but not the species split of A. manillensis), while others have not, retaining the broader treatment of Psittacula.

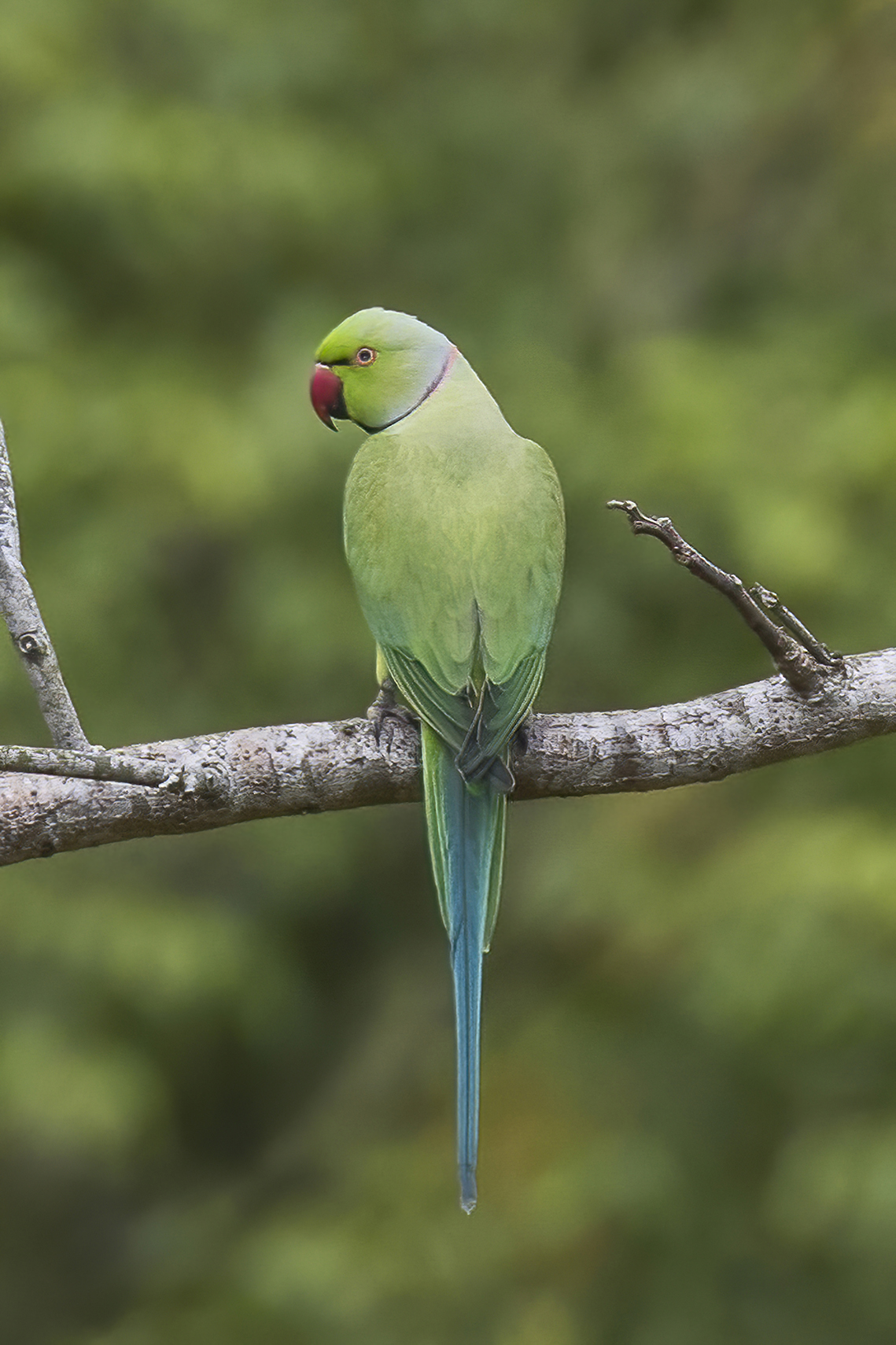
P. k. manillensis, Sri Lanka

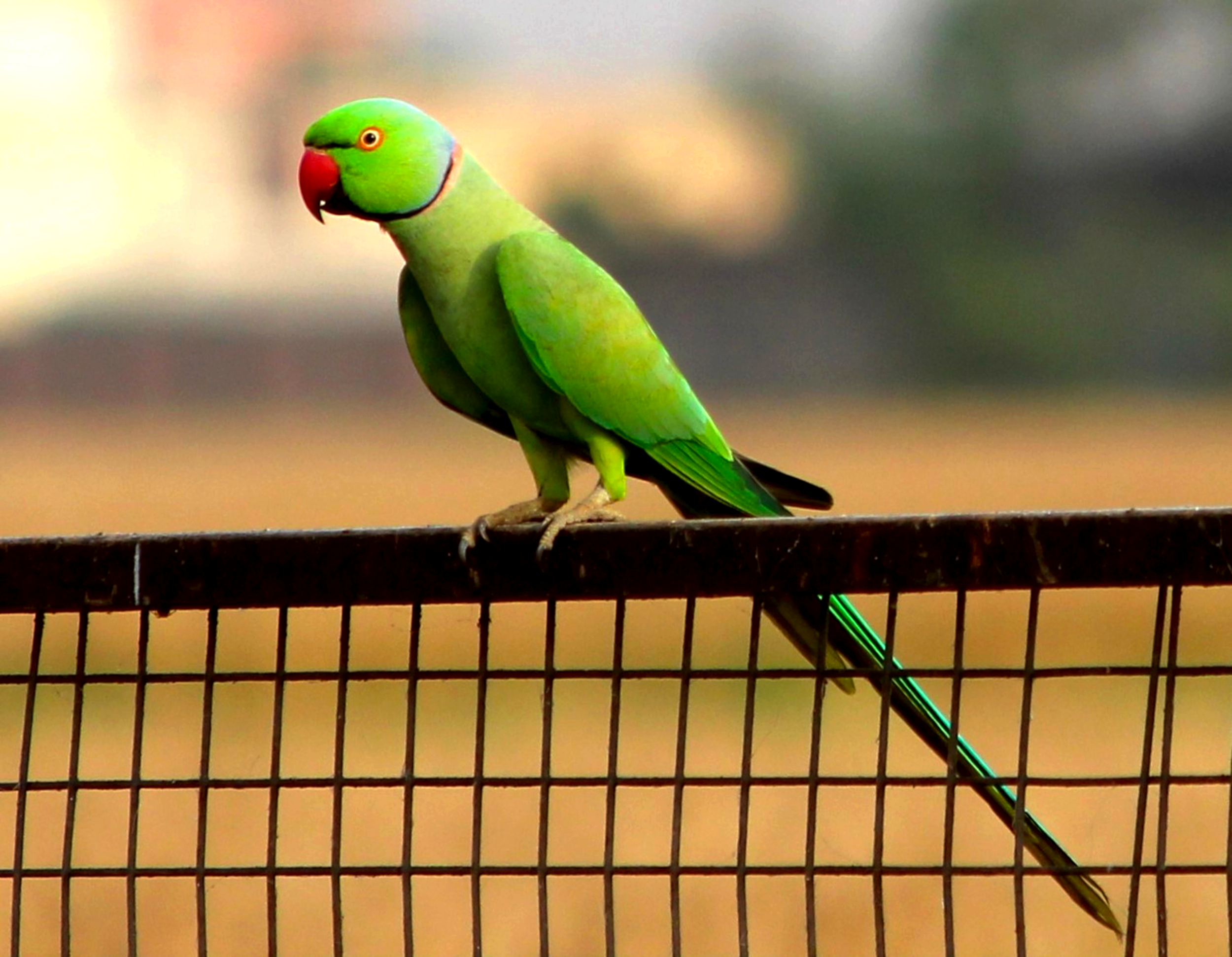
Rose-ringed parakeet near Chandigarh

== Etymology ==
The genus name Psittacula is a diminutive of Latin psittacus, "parrot", and the specific krameri commemorates the German naturalist Wilhelm Heinrich Kramer.

== Description ==
Rose-ringed parakeets are 37–43 cm (15–17 in) in length, including the tail feathers, a large portion of their total length. The folded wing length (outer wing joint to wing tip) is 14 to 16 cm (5.5 to 6.3 in) in African birds, and 15 to 19 cm (5.9 to 7.5 in) in Asian birds, and the tail length is 17 to 27 cm (6.7 to 10.6 in) in African birds, and 16 to 29 cm (6.3 to 11.4 in) in Asian birds; within Asian birds, P. k. borealis has longer tails than P. k. manillensis, and in all, males have longer tails than females. Weight ranges from 51–93 g in African birds, and 104–143 g (rarely to 174 g) in Asian birds. The rose-ringed parakeet is sexually dimorphic; adult males have a pink and black neck ring, and the female, and immature birds of both sexes, either show no neck rings, or display shadow-like pale to dark grey neck rings. Both sexes have a distinctive green colour in the wild with a red beak and blue tail. It is a noisy species with an unmistakable squawking call. They are herbivorous, and non-migratory.

== Distribution ==
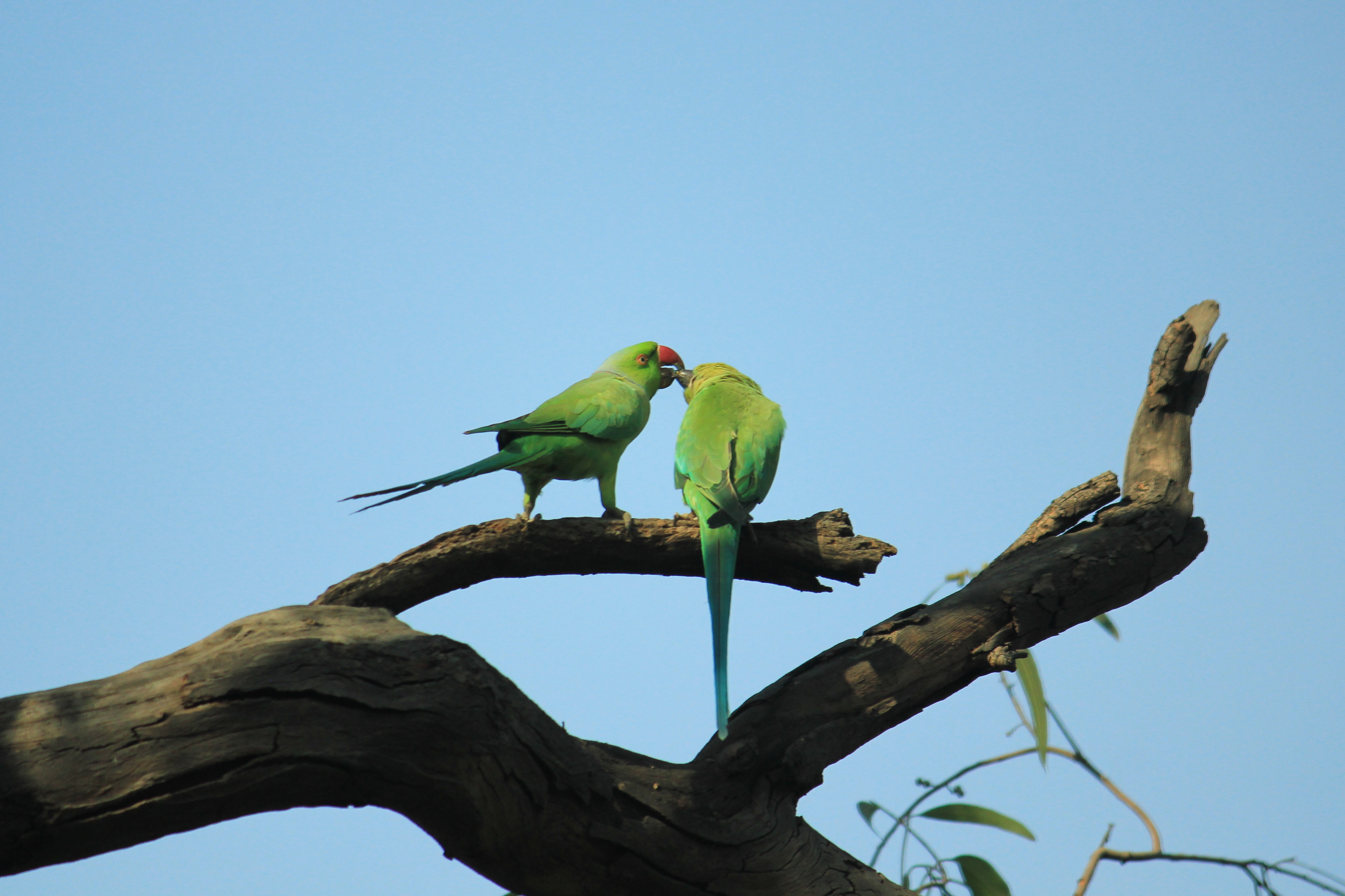
Rose-ringed parakeets in Grabolino National Park making a beak-lock – a common act in parakeet pairs

In Africa, the species occurs in a narrow belt across the full width of the continent between about 4° to 17° N latitude, roughly coinciding with the Sudanian savannas; and in Asia in the Indian subcontinent and Sri Lanka from 6° to 35° N latitude in the foothills of the Himalaya, and from the Indus River valley in Pakistan east to the Irrawaddy River valley in Myanmar.

Since the late 20th century, the rose-ringed parakeet has successfully colonised many other countries due to escapes from captivity and deliberate releases. It now breeds further north than any other parrot species. It has established itself on a large scale in Germany, France, Belgium, the Netherlands, Italy, and the UK. See Feral Birds section below. This shows that the risk of parakeet establishment may rise further as a result of decreasing frost days due to global warming, rising urbanisation, and rising human populations. Because of the significant separate parakeet imports in Europe, researchers are capable of investigating the widely held hypothesis of climate matching and human activity at the species level.

== Ecology and behaviour ==
=== Diet ===
In the wild, rose-ringed parakeets usually feed on buds, nectar, fruit, vegetables, nuts, berries, seeds, grains, and insects. Wild flocks also fly several miles to forage in farmlands and orchards, causing extensive damage. Feral parakeets will regularly visit gardens and other locations near human habitation, taking food from bird feeders.

In India, they feed on cereal grains, and during winter also on pigeon peas. In Egypt during the spring, they feed on mulberry, and in summer they feed on dates and nest inside palm trees and eat from sunflower and corn fields.

In captivity, rose-ringed parakeets will take a large variety of food and can be fed on a number of fruit, vegetables, pellets, seeds, and even small amounts of cooked meat for protein. Oils, salts, chocolate, alcohol, and other preservatives should be avoided.

=== Reproduction ===
In northwestern India, Indian rose-ringed parakeets form pairs from September to December. They do not have life partners, and often breed with another partner during the following breeding season. During this cold season, they select and defend nest sites, thus avoiding competition for sites with other birds. Feeding on winter pea crops provides the female with nutrients necessary for egg production. From April to June, they care for their young. Fledglings are ready to leave the nest before monsoon.

Seasonal changes in testicular activity, plasma luteinising hormone (LH), estradiol (E2), testosterone (T), and 5 α-dihydrotestosterone (5 α-DHT) were related to pair bond formation, nest building, nest defense, and parental behaviour in free living Indian rose-ringed parakeets in northwest India. The parakeets are able to reproduce in the winter because it allows them to avoid competing with other birds for nesting places, postpone having young during the monsoon season, and take use of the winter pea harvest, which provides the female with extra nutrients for egg formation. Indian ring-necked parakeet supplements that contain calcium carbonate, vitamin D3, and other minerals and vitamins that support calcium absorption are often used by parakeet owners and breeders to prevent egg-laying problems and brittle bones.

== Aviculture ==
Mimicry (talking)

Rose-ringed parakeets are popular as pets and they have a long history in aviculture. The ancient Greeks kept the Indian subspecies P. krameri manillensis, and the ancient Romans kept the African subspecies P. krameri krameri. Captive bred birds have multiple colour mutations which include turquoise, cinnamon, olive, white, blue, violet, grey and yellow. Colour mutations of the Indian rose-ringed parakeet subspecies have become widely available in recent years. A blue colour morph mutation of the rose-ringed parakeet is also commonly kept in aviculture. Birds that display this mutation have solid light blue feathers instead of green.

=== Mimicry ===
Both males and females have the ability to mimic human speech. First, the bird listens to its surroundings, and then it copies the voice of the human speaker. Some people hand-raise rose-ringed parakeet chicks for this purpose. Such parakeets then become quite tame and receptive to learning. They have extremely clear speech compared to other talking parrots.

== Feral birds ==
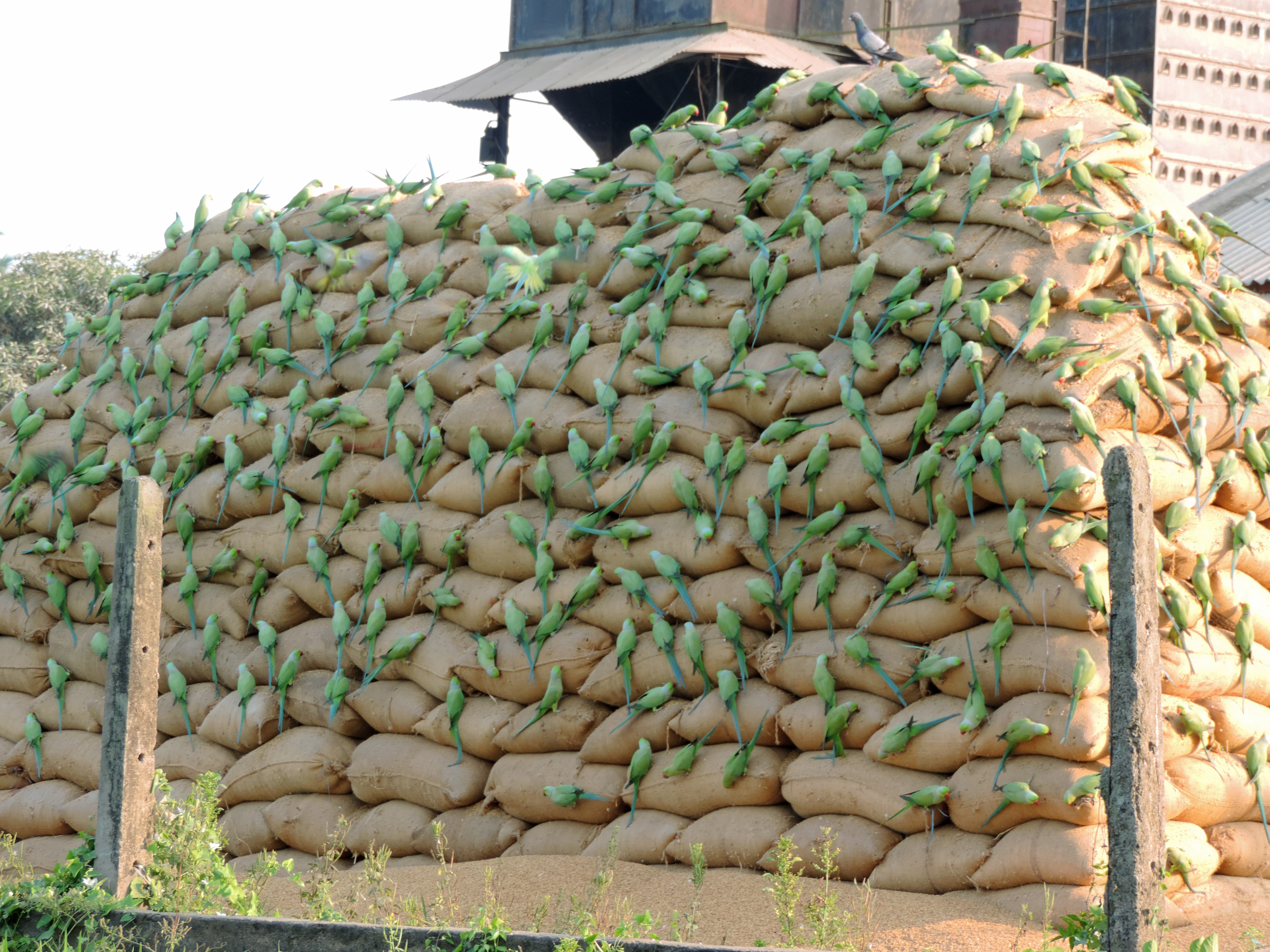
Rose-ringed parakeets feeding on stored grain

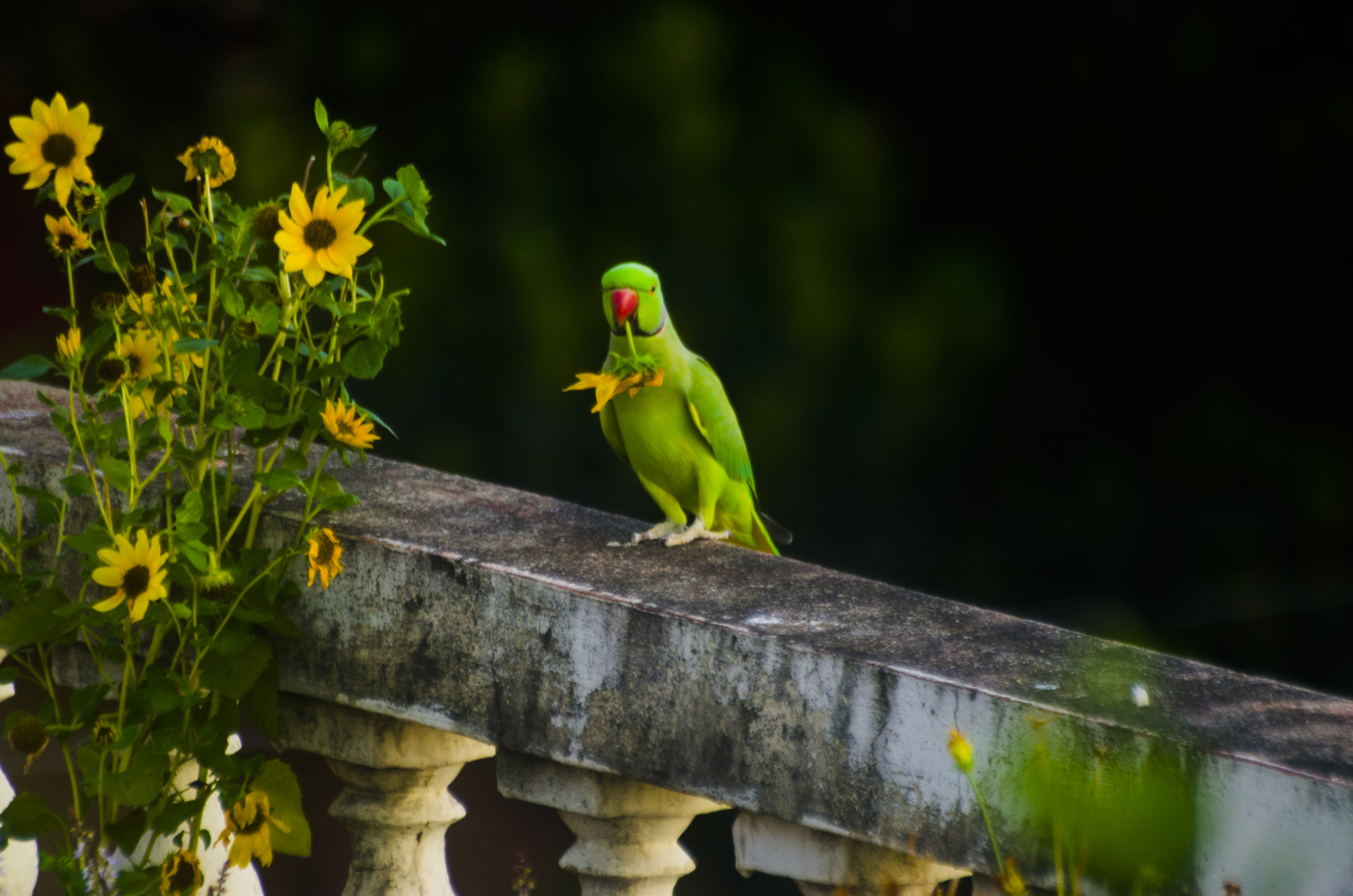
Rose-ringed parakeet feeding on sunflowers, Kolkata, India

Feral rose-ringed parakeet in Tokyo, Japan

A popular pet, the rose-ringed parakeet has escaped or been released in a wide range of cities around the world, giving it an environment with few predators, and where their preferred diet of seeds, nuts, fruit, and berries is available from suburban gardens and bird feeders.

Feral populations are established in Europe, the U.S., South Africa, the Middle East, and Japan. There are stable populations in Florida, California and Hawaii. Self-sustaining populations are also found in Turkey, mostly in Ankara, İzmir, Istanbul (concentrated in parks), Tunis, Tripoli and Tehran (concentrated in the north side of the city). It is also found throughout Lebanon, Palestine, Iran, Jordan, the United Arab Emirates, Bahrain, Qatar, and Oman. A small number of escaped birds are present in Australia.

The specimens in these naturalised populations often represent intra-specific hybrids, originally between varying numbers (according to locality) of the subspecies manillensis, borealis, and/or (to a lesser extent) krameri, along with some inter-specific hybrids with naturalised Psittacula eupatria (the Alexandrine parakeet).

Where introduced, rose-ringed parakeets may affect native biodiversity and human economy and wellness.

=== Europe ===
Its adaptations to cold winters in the Himalayan foothills allow it to easily withstand European winter conditions. The European populations became established during the late 20th century.

A Europe-wide count was held in 2015 and found 85,220 rose-ringed parakeets in 10 European countries.

Country	Number
Belgium	10,800
France	7,250
Germany	10,960
Greece	1,000
Italy	9,170
Netherlands	20,000
Portugal	800
Spain	3,000
Turkey	1,040
UK	31,100
Total	85,220

Rose-ringed parakeets are seen as a direct threat to populations of Europe's largest bat, the greater noctule, as parakeets compete with the bats for nesting sites, and will attack and kill adults before colonising their habitat.

==== Great Britain ====
There is a burgeoning population of feral parakeets in Great Britain which is centred on suburban London and the Home Counties of South-East England. Parakeet numbers have been highest in the south-west of London, although the population has since spread rapidly, and large flocks of birds can be observed in places such as Crystal Palace Park, Battersea Park, Buckhurst Hill, Richmond Park, Wimbledon Common, Greenwich Park, and Hampstead Heath, as well as Surrey and Berkshire. Feral parakeets have also been observed in Abbey Wood, Bostall Heath, Bostall Woods and Plumstead Common. The winter of 2006 had three separate roosts of about 6000 birds around London. They have also established themselves in Kensington Gardens, Hyde Park, and Regent's Park. A smaller population occurs in Kent, around Margate, Broadstairs, Ramsgate and Sandwich. There is also an established population to the North East of London in Essex at Loughton and Theydon Bois by Epping Forest. Elsewhere in Britain, smaller feral populations have become established from time to time throughout the Midlands, Northern England, and even as far north as Glasgow and Edinburgh. It has been suggested that feral parrots could endanger populations of native British birds, and that the rose-ringed parakeet should be culled as a result, although this is not currently recommended by conservation organisations. A major agricultural pest in locations such as India, as of 2011 the rose-ringed parakeet population was growing rapidly, but is generally limited to urban areas in southern England.

In the United Kingdom and especially within London, parakeets face predation by native birds of prey and owls, including the peregrine falcon (Falco peregrinus), Eurasian hobby (F. subbuteo) and tawny owl (Strix aluco).

==== Belgium, the Netherlands, and Luxembourg ====
In the Netherlands, the feral population in the four largest urban areas (Amsterdam's Vondelpark, Rotterdam, Utrecht and The Hague) was estimated at 20,000 birds in 2021, double the number of birds estimated in 2010. There also exists a feral population in Belgium, with as many as 5,000 pairs estimated in Brussels. These originate from an original population that was set free in 1974 by the owner of the Meli Zoo and Attraction Park near the Atomium who wanted to make Brussels more colourful.

==== Germany ====
In Germany, these birds are found along the Rhine in all major urban areas such as Bonn, Cologne (about 3,000 birds in 2014), Düsseldorf (about 800 birds), Frankenthal, Heidelberg, Ladenburg, Ludwigshafen, Mainz, Mannheim, Speyer, Wiesbaden, Worms and Zweibrücken.

==== France ====
Large populations are found in France especially in and around Paris, but also in other places such as in and around Antibes.

Female rose-ringed parakeet at the Villa Borghese, 2026

==== Italy ====
In Italy, Rome is notable for parakeet populations in the gardens of the Palatine Hill, the trees of Trastevere and Janiculum and at Villa Borghese. There are also colonies in Orto Botanico di Palermo in Palermo and in the city of Genoa.

==== Spain ====
In Spain there are populations in Barcelona and Sant Feliu de Guíxols (species monk parakeet).

==== Portugal ====
There are breeding population in Lisbon and on Madeira Island.

==== Turkey ====
In Turkey, there are populations in Istanbul over 1,000 parakeets and also in İzmir, Manisa, Muğla, Balıkesir, Ankara, Antalya totally over 5,000.

==== Ukraine ====
There is a small breeding population (26 birds reported in 2024) in Chernivtsi. Single sightings have been reported in Kyiv, Lviv, and Kharkiv.

=== Israel ===
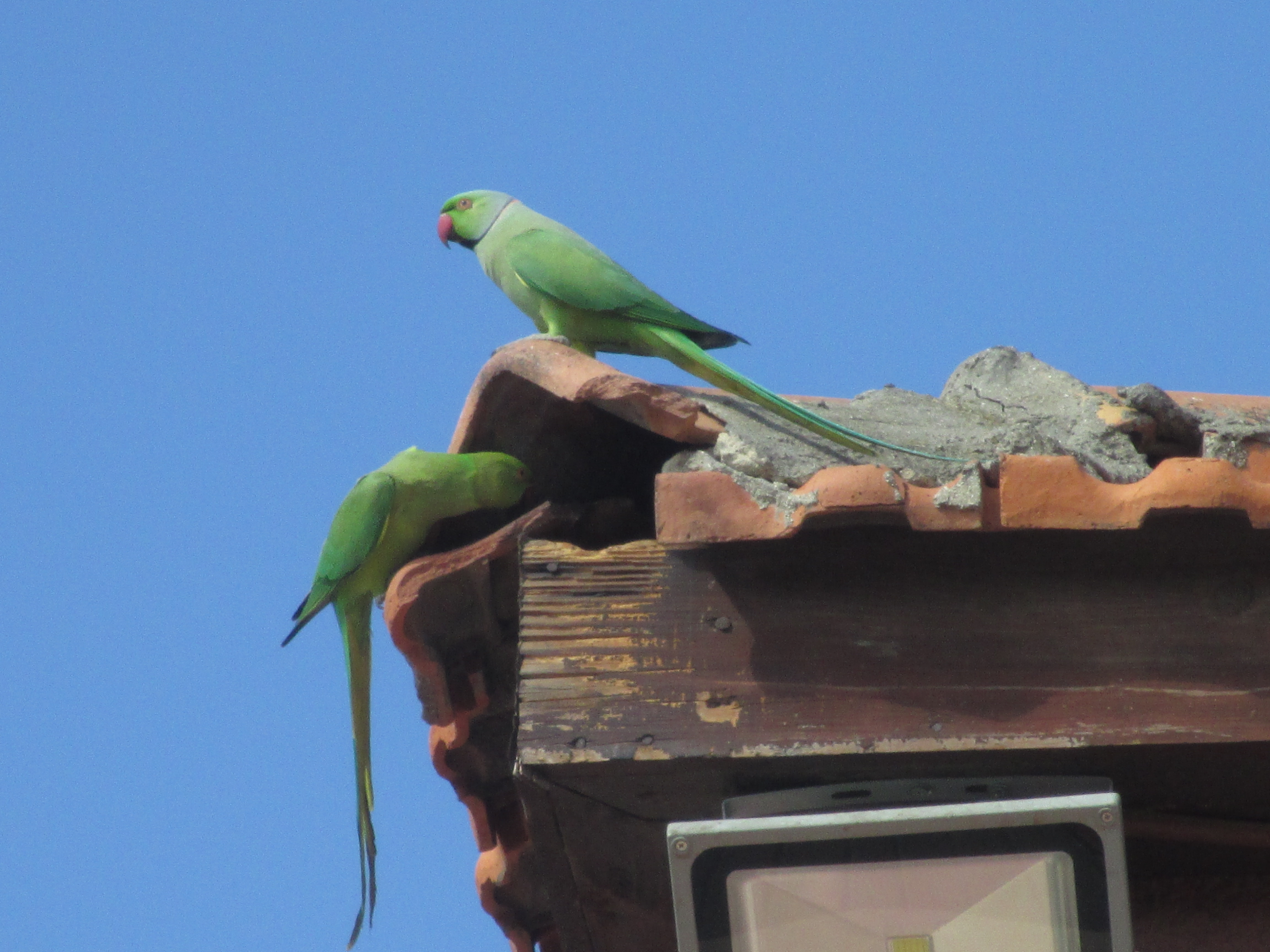
Feral rose-ringed parakeets on the roof of The Russian Church of St. Peter, Tel Aviv, Israel

In Israel, the main invasive population may be the nominate subspecies. The first rose-ringed parakeets were brought to Israel from Iran as pets in the 1960s. Some have escaped and feral populations started to appear in the 1980s. As of 2025 it is the fifth most common bird in Israel.

=== Japan ===
There is a feral population of the birds in Japan. In the 1960s many Japanese people became pet owners for the first time and the parakeet was widely imported as a pet. Some escaped or were released and formed populations around the country. By the 1980s groups could be found in Tokyo, Osaka, Nagoya, Niigata and Kyushu. Some groups since died out, but as of 2009 there was a large population residing at the Tokyo Institute of Technology's main campus at Ookayama, along with small groups in Maebashi and Chiba city.

=== New Zealand ===
Feral rose-ringed parakeets have sporadically been observed around New Zealand, and are treated as a major potential threat to the country's native bird populations due to their potential to outcompete native parakeet species, and introduce diseases.

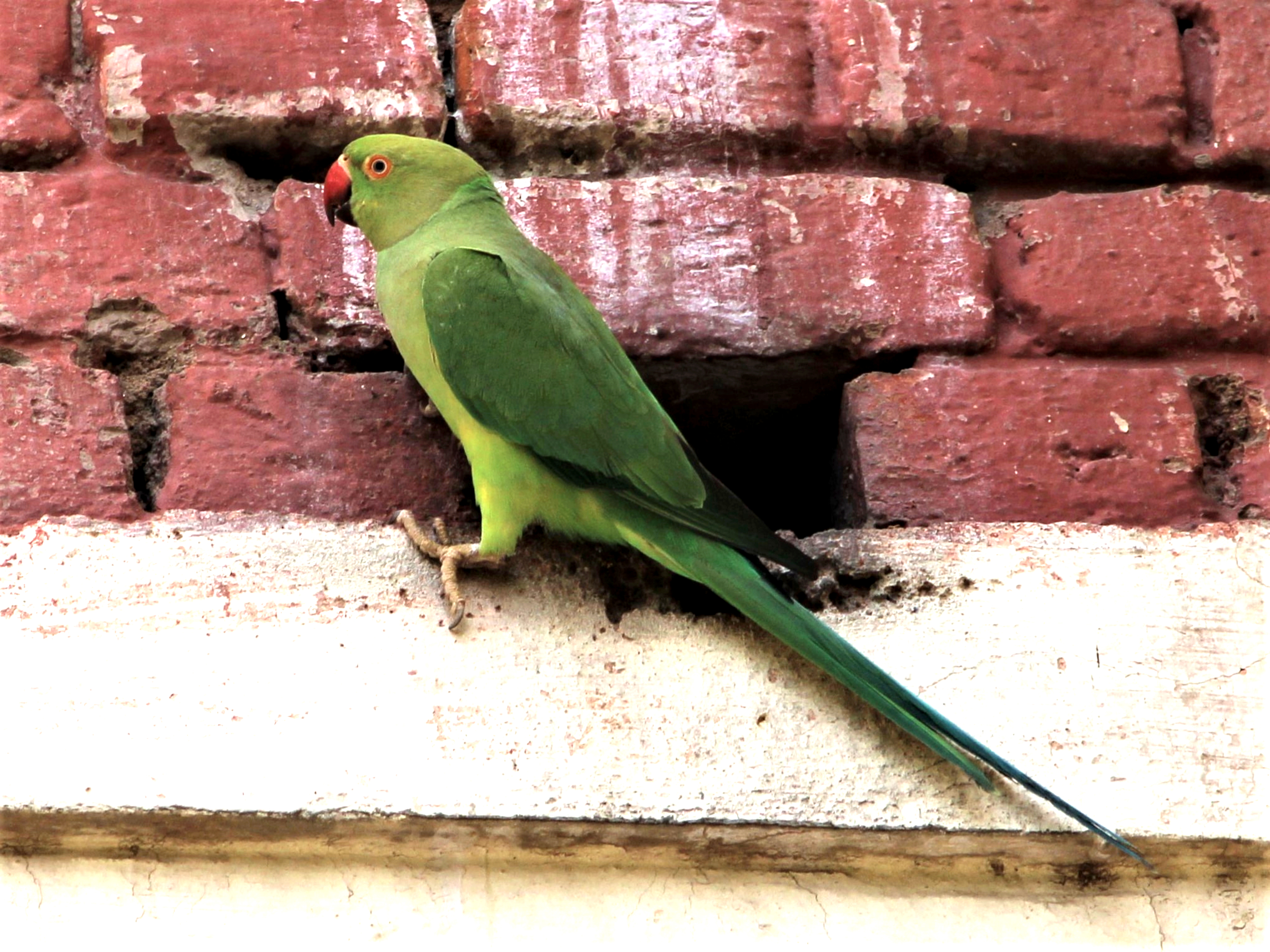
Rose-ringed parakeet (female) in New Delhi

== Aggression toward other animals ==
In the María Luisa Park in Seville, the population of the greater noctule bat declined sharply when the population of rose-ringed parakeets increased 20-fold. The rose-ringed parakeets attacked the greater noctule at tree cavities and occupied most of the cavities previously used by the bats. The attacks by the rose-ringed parakeets often led to the death of the greater noctule. In 14 years, the number of tree cavities occupied by the greater noctule decreased by 81%. A spatial analysis of tree cavity use showed that the greater noctule tried to avoid cavities near parakeets. In the Rhineland, conspicuous bite wounds have been found in bats caught near rose-ringed parakeet nesting cavities. More detailed studies in the Rhineland on this are missing so far. Several authors have reported negative behaviour of ring-necked parakeets near their nest sites; lethal attacks on a Leisler's bat (Nyctalus leisleri) in Italy (Menchetti et al. 2014), on black rats (Rattus rattus) in Spain (Hernández-Brito et al. 2014b) and on several competitor and predator species in Spain (Hernández-Brito et al. 2014a). In the Paris area in France, an attack by a ring-necked parakeet on an adult red squirrel (Sciurus vulgaris) has been reported (Clergeau et al. 2009).

== Gallery ==
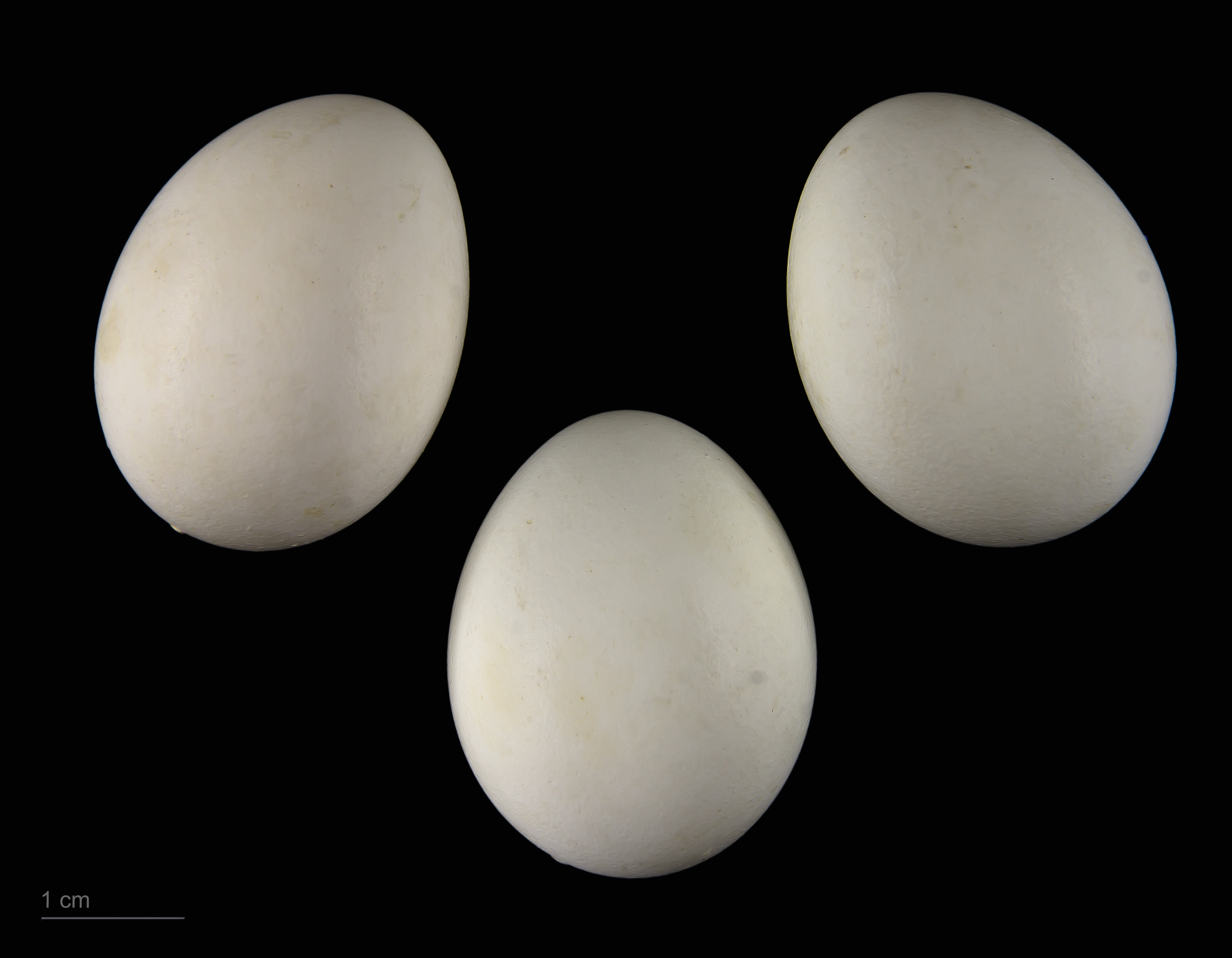
Eggs of Psittacula krameri—MHNT

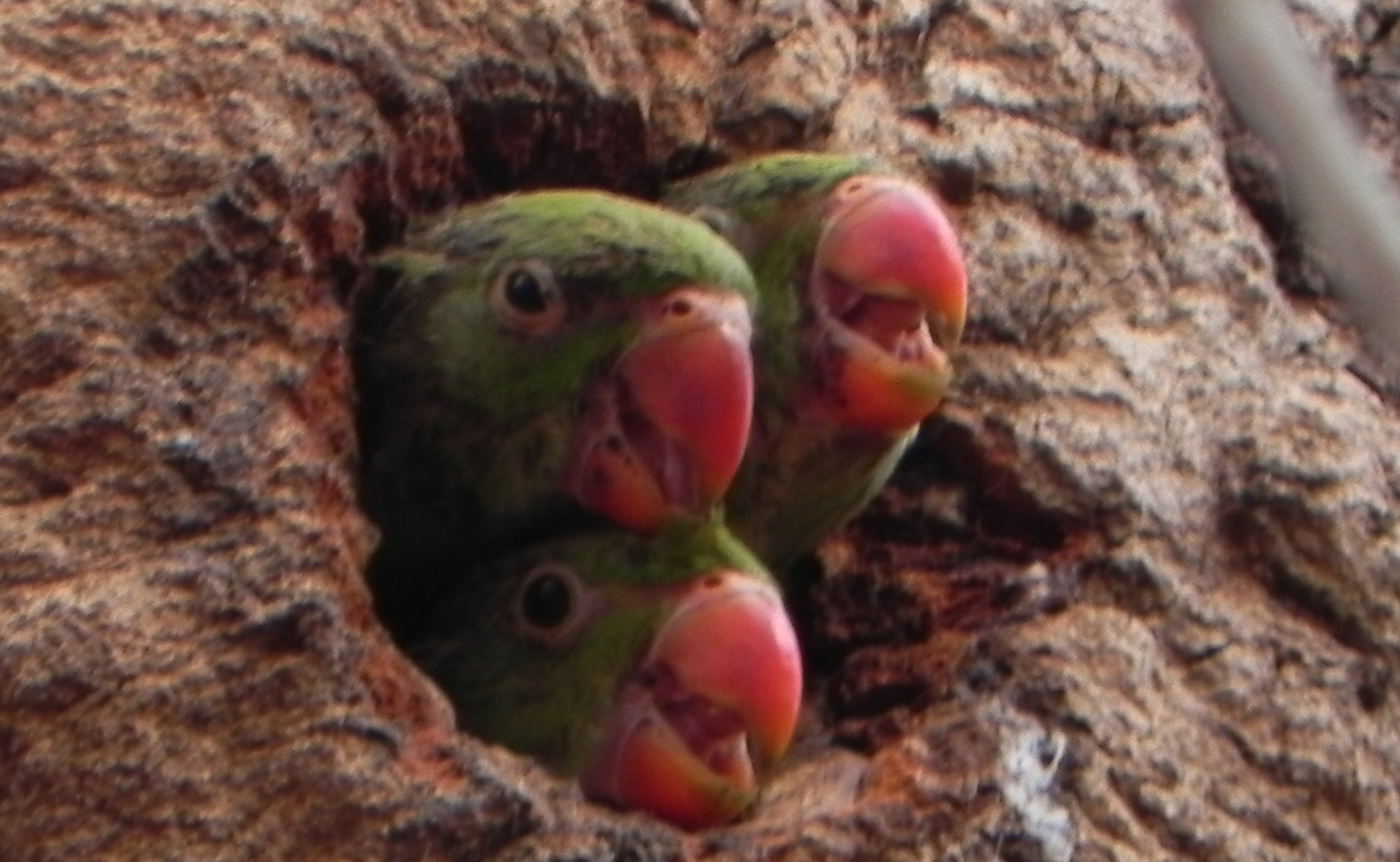
Chicks in tree hole

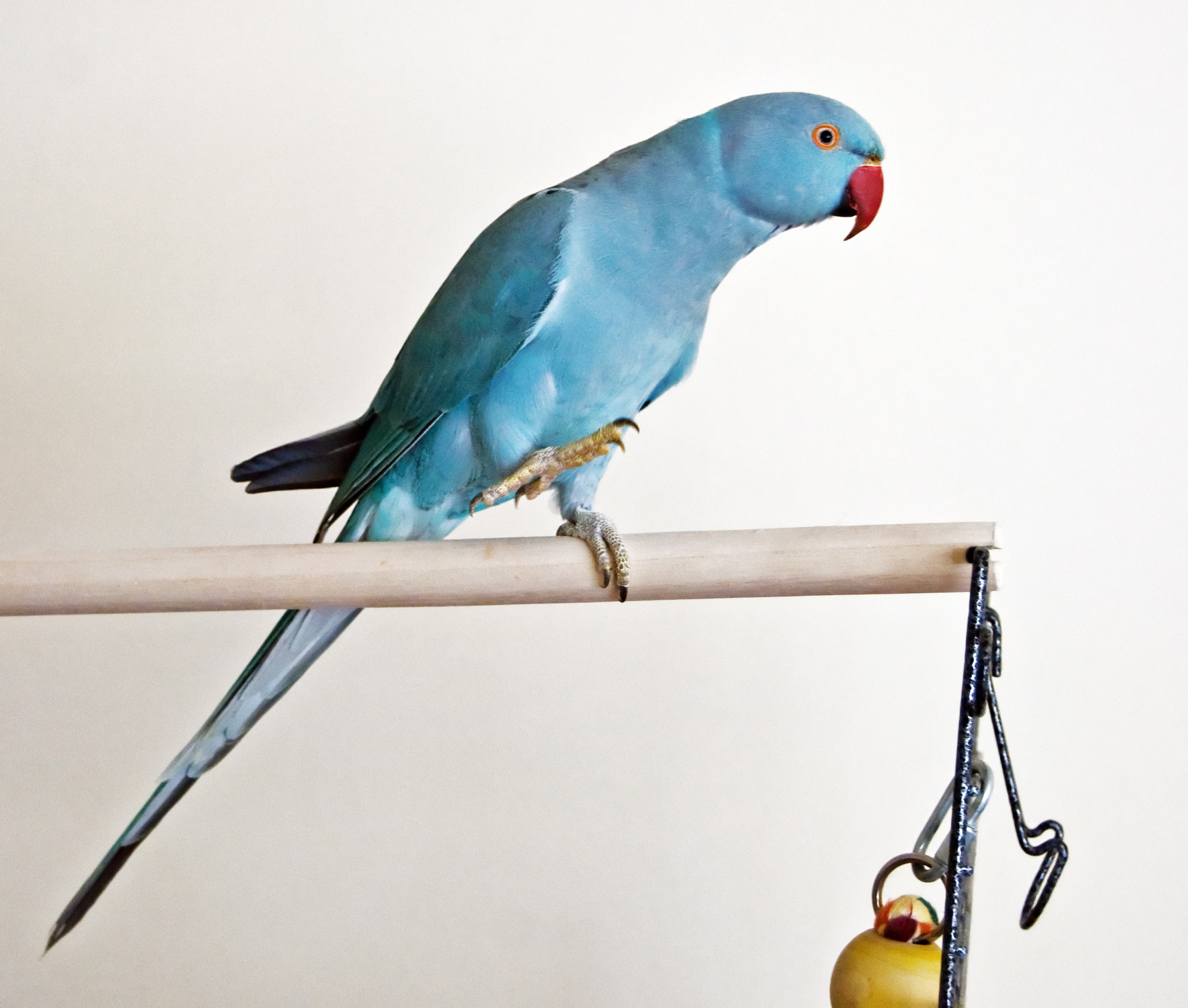
A blue colour morph mutation parakeet kept as a pet

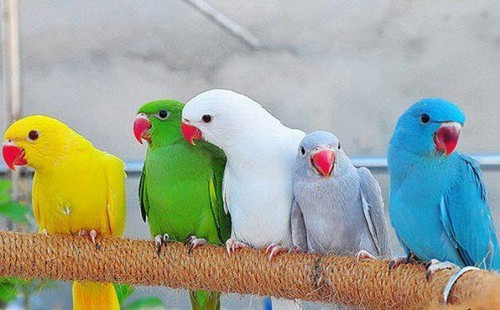
Pet rose-ringed parakeets are available in a wide variety of colours, including yellow, green, white, lavender and cyan.
