= Feral parakeets in Great Britain =

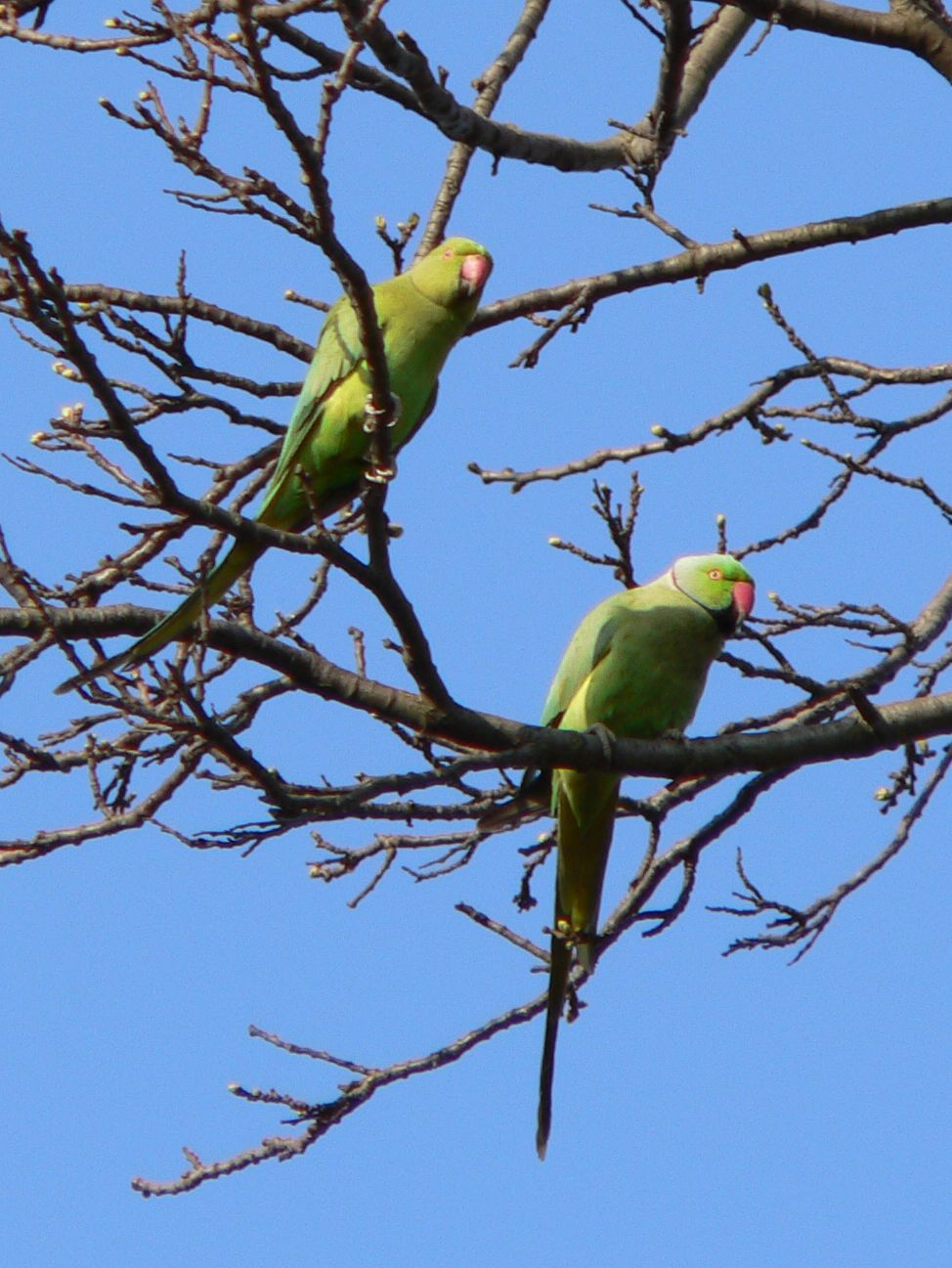
Parakeets in Kew Gardens

Parakeets in Great Britain are wild-living, non-native parakeets that are an introduced species into Great Britain. The population mainly consists of rose-ringed parakeets (Psittacula krameri), a non-migratory species of bird native to Africa and the Indian subcontinent, with a few, small breeding populations of monk parakeets, and other occasional escaped cage birds. The origins of these birds are the subject of speculation, but they are generally thought to have bred from birds that escaped from captivity or were released.

The British rose-ringed parakeet or ringneck parrot population is mostly concentrated in suburban areas of London and the Home Counties of South-East England. The parakeets are now found across many parts of Britain. Separate rose-ringed parakeet populations exist in and around other European cities.

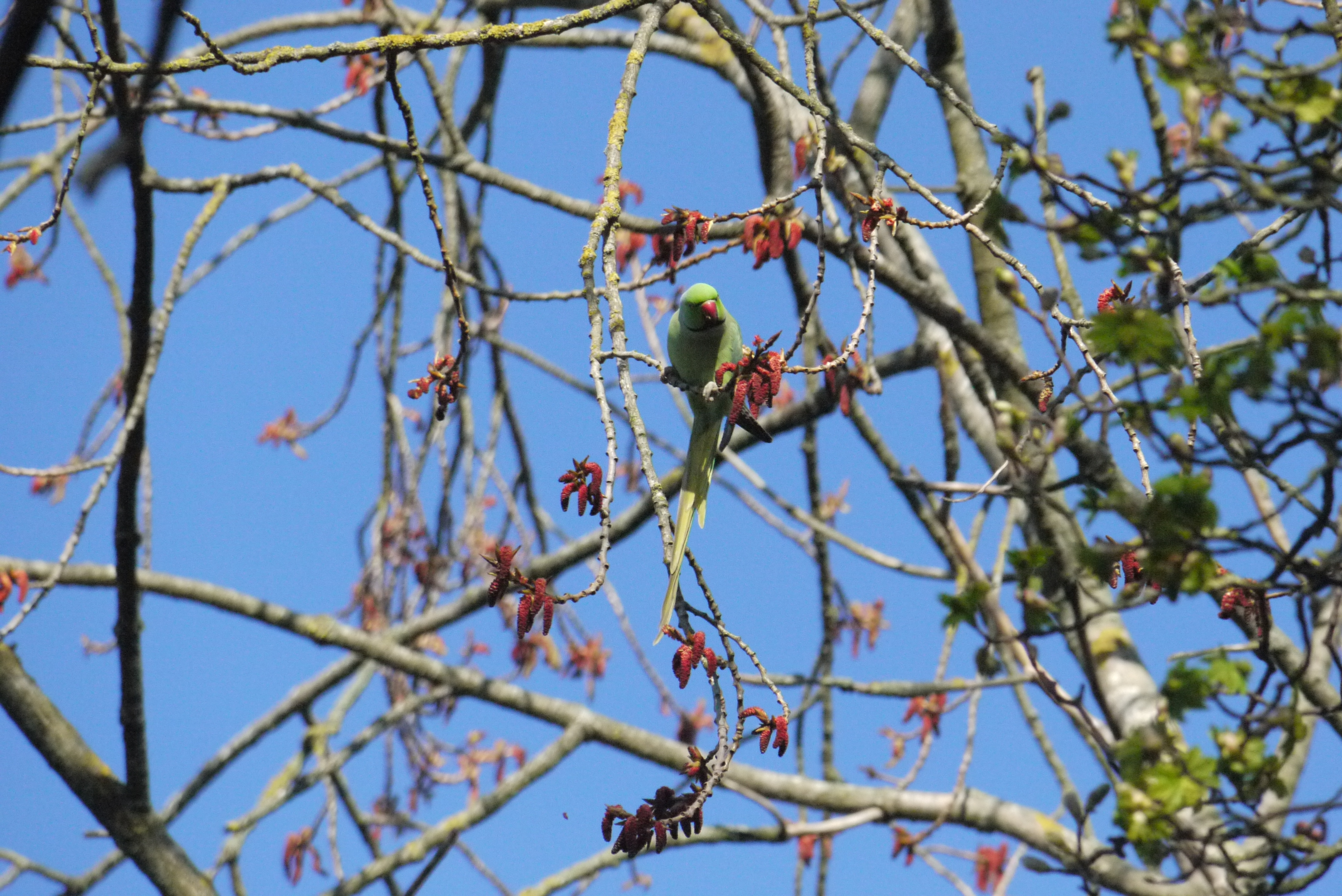
Gosforth colony, Newcastle upon Tyne, April 2021

== Origin of the birds ==
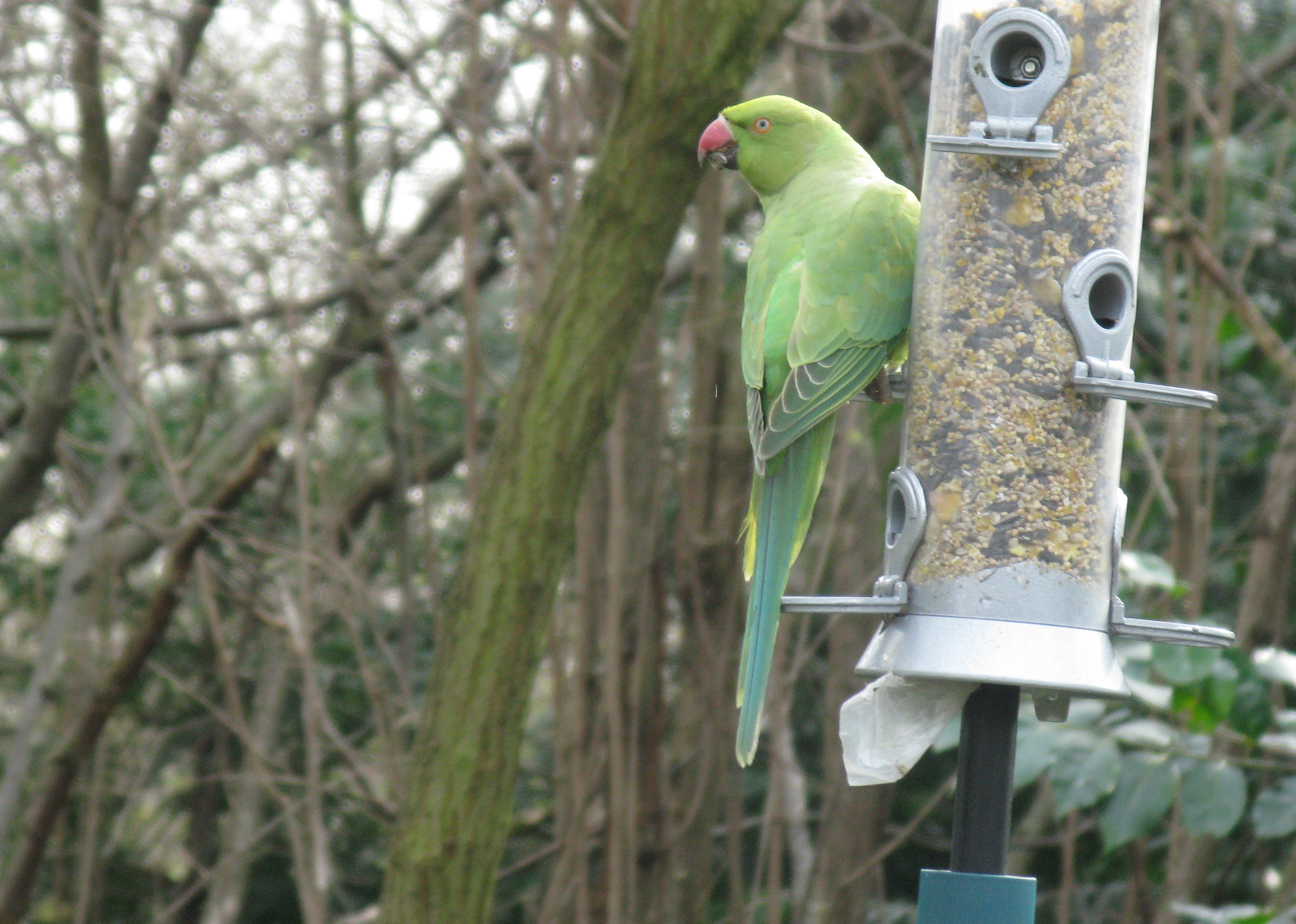
Bird feeder in Kensington Gardens

Most ornithologists believe that the original birds probably escaped from aviaries before 1971. Sporadic breeding pairs were recorded as early as 1855 and in the following decades, but these did not spread and are not ancestral to the modern feral population, which originated by the 1960s.

In a 2019 Journal of Zoology study, geographic profiling based on NBN Atlas data revealed that the largest populations of parakeets before 1980 were in the Croydon and Dartford areas. The same study consulted the British Newspaper Archive, and suggested that outbreaks of psittacosis (also known as "parrot fever") in 1929-30 and the 1950s may have caused many Britons to abandon their pet parakeets, eventually giving rise to large feral populations. In later decades, heightened popularity of parakeets as pets and the subsequent increase in accidental escapes may have been to blame, lending some credence to the theory regarding aviaries in the Great Storm of 1987.

In terms of geographic origin, the British rose-ringed parakeets are of hybrid origin between the two Asian subspecies, P. k. borealis and P. k. manillensis.

Several urban myths explaining the origin of the birds have also been published in newspapers:

- Parakeets that escaped from the branch of Ealing Studios used for the filming of The African Queen (Isleworth Studios) in 1951.
- Parakeets that escaped from damaged aviaries during the Great Storm of 1987.
- A pair of parakeets released by Jimi Hendrix in Carnaby Street, London, in the 1960s.
- A number of parakeets that reportedly escaped from a pet shop in Sunbury-on-Thames in 1970.

== Population in Britain ==
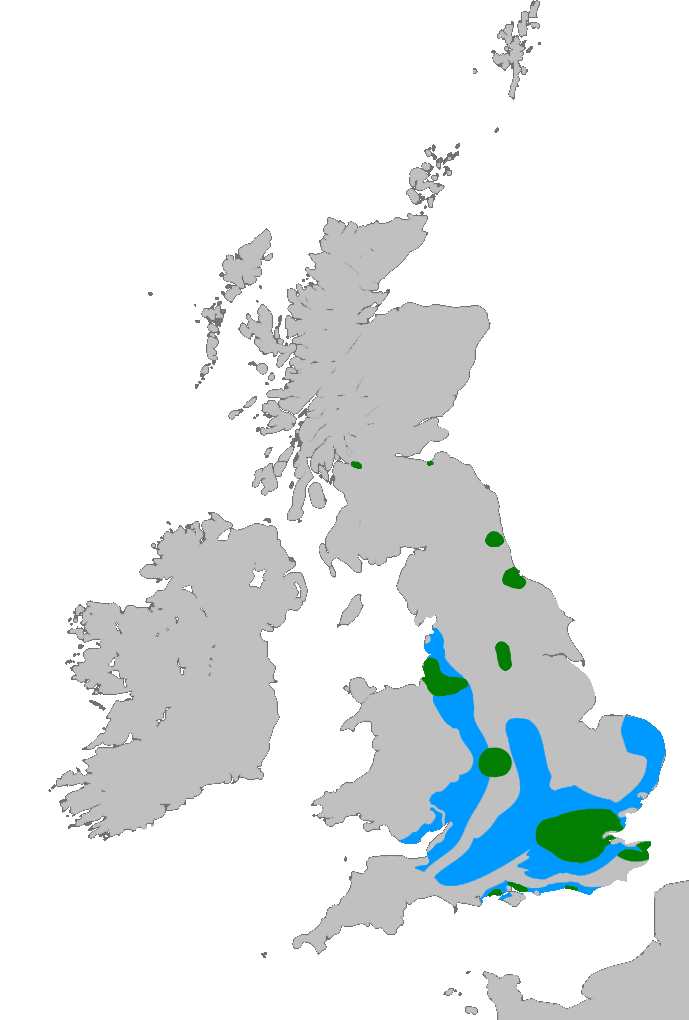
Rose-ringed parakeet distribution in Great Britain, 2017. Resident Post-breeding dispersal

Escaped parakeets have been spotted in Britain since the 19th century. Early occurrences of feral parakeets in England included specimens observed in 1855 in Norfolk, south of London in the 1890s, and Loughton in 1930, all of which nested and hatched offspring.

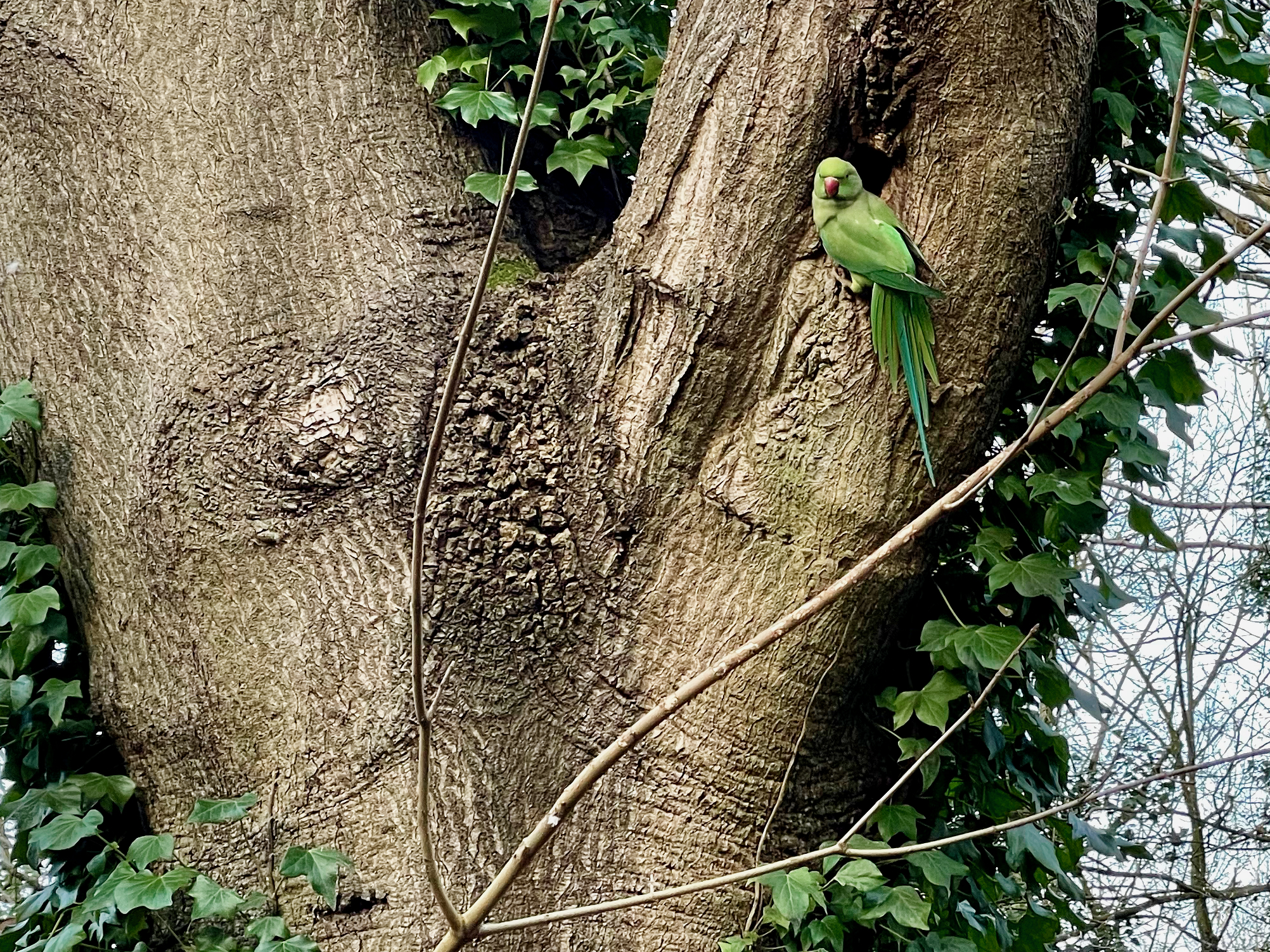
One outside its nest on Hampstead Heath

In the decades since, parakeets continued to escape captivity. Populations repeatedly died out until 1969, when the population of parakeets began to breed and sustain itself in London for the first time. Beginning in Croydon, the parakeets spread to Wraysbury, Bromley, and Esher.

In 1969, small flocks spread from London to towns in northwestern Kent such as Rochester, Northfleet, Gravesend, and Shorne and increased in numbers over the following decade, eventually spreading east into Medway and north into marshland areas. Small populations became established in Surrey towns adjacent to London, and in Wraysbury and Old Windsor in Berkshire.

Outside of the greater London area, secondary feral populations became established in Greater Manchester in the mid-1970s and in Merseyside in the early 1980s. Individuals were recorded in the 1970s in the Cuckmere Valley of East Sussex and the Chichester Harbour of West Sussex. By the 1980s and 1990s, the northwestern populations largely died out. The groups elsewhere remained stable and tended to increase, with several new colonies becoming established. The overall population by the mid-1980s was estimated at 1,000 individuals at a minimum, of which 300 lived in London.

In the mid-1990s, the population appeared to start increasing rapidly. The population was estimated at 500 birds in 1983, reached 1,500 by 1996, 4,000-4,500 by 2000, and 5,800 in the London area in 2002, sheltering in up to five roosts. At this point, the species' range had expanded into Buckinghamshire, Berkshire, Middlesex, and outlying areas of Surrey. The last official roost count, in 2012, recorded 32,000 parakeets in London.

British rose-ringed parakeets are most common in the south-east of England, including London suburbs, Surrey, Kent and Sussex, and in South West England, including Devon, Cornwall, and Somerset. Parakeet populations have also been reported further north in Liverpool, Oxford, Birmingham, Manchester, Leeds, Bradford, Sheffield, Newcastle, Edinburgh and Glasgow. A roost count on 22 November 2025 of the population in Newcastle totalled 360 birds.

Due to population growth and the relatively quick spread throughout Britain, estimates of parakeet numbers within the country vary. According to the London Natural History Society, in the early 2000s the largest population of rose-ringed parakeets was believed to exist in the South London suburbs, where the birds roosted principally in Esher Rugby Ground, Esher until 2007. Esher Rugby Club named its women's team "The Parakeets" in a tribute to the birds.

In 2017, The Royal Society for the Protection of Birds (RSPB) estimated there to be around 8,600 breeding pairs in Britain. Other scientific counts conducted in 2012 placed the number at around 32,000 birds. The rose-ringed parakeet is scientifically monitored by the British Trust for Ornithology (BTO) and, as of 2022, estimate about 12,000 breeding pairs. A 2026 estimate has raised this to 50,000, with a proposal to allow hunting of the bird by legal hunters.

== Ecological impact ==
Concerns have been raised by Hazel Jackson, an expert in invasive species and conservation at the University of Kent, over the impact of the growing numbers of rose-ringed parakeets in south-east England. Scientific research programmes have analysed the behaviour of parakeets and found that they compete with native bird species and bats for food and nesting sites. Parakeets have been shown to deter smaller birds due to their behaviour and noise; their large size means that they often crowd small bird feeders, further increasing competition for resources and disrupting local ecosystems.

The detrimental effect of competitive exclusion has been likened to the impact of the introduction of grey squirrels on the red squirrel. However, rose-ringed parakeets do have natural predators native to Britain: ornithologists have observed an increase in the population of birds of prey in London, and have reported sparrowhawks, peregrine falcons, and hobbies preying on parakeets.

Rose-ringed parakeets are considered a pest in many countries such as Israel, where large swarms of parakeets can have a devastating effect on certain crops, and there is concern that the rapidly growing parakeet population could have unforeseen environmental impact in Britain. In 2009, the governmental wildlife organisation Natural England added feral parakeets to the "general licence", a list of wild species that can be culled lawfully without the need for specific permission. Feral monk parakeets (Myiopsitta monachus) were subsequently also covered by the licence. In March 2021, the Department for Environment, Food and Rural Affairs stated that no cull of the ring-necked parakeet population in the UK was planned.

== See also ==
- British avifauna
- Feral parrot
- List of birds of Great Britain
- List of non-native birds of Great Britain
