= Mark Bittner =

American writer (1951–2026)

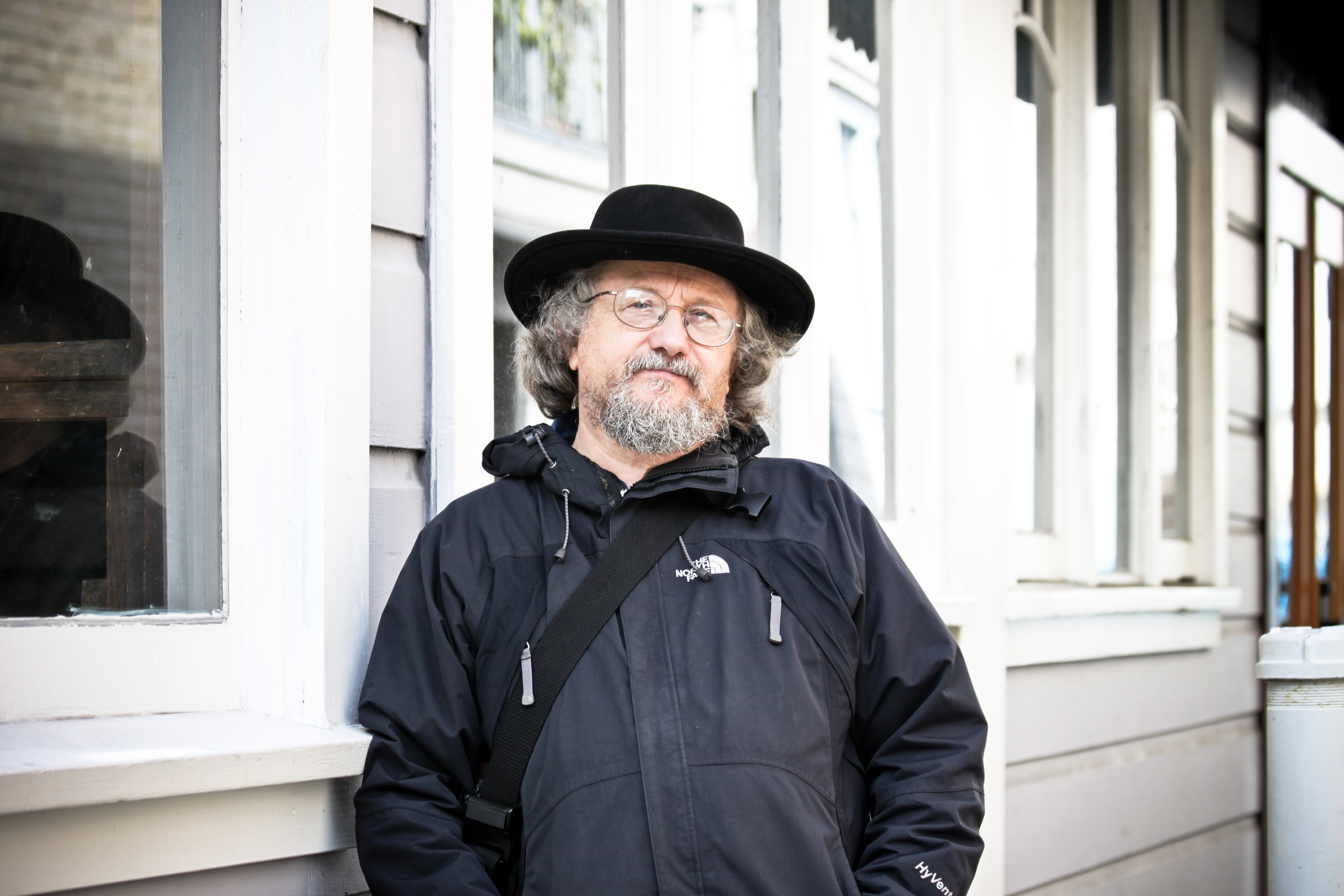
Mark Bittner

Mark Bittner (November 29, 1951 – March 1, 2026) was an American writer. He was the author of The Wild Parrots of Telegraph Hill, the book which accompanies the film The Wild Parrots of Telegraph Hill.

== Life and career ==
Bittner was born in Vancouver, Washington, on November 29, 1951.

He spent 14 years on the streets of San Francisco after his dream of becoming a professional musician fell apart. After many years of doing odd jobs while maintaining a The Dharma Bums-type lifestyle, he found a flock of naturalized parrots (mostly cherry-headed conures, also known as red-masked parakeets) in the area of Telegraph Hill.

His book, The Wild Parrots of Telegraph Hill, and the documentary of the same name, by Judy Irving, describe that encounter and the relationship he formed with the birds. In 2006, Judy married Mark Bittner after the two fell in love during the filming of Parrots.

Bittner later concluded that human feeding of the wild birds in parks (as opposed to backyard feeders) was a bad idea. He was among those who persuaded the San Francisco Board of Supervisors to pass an ordinance prohibiting the practice.

He was a member of the South End Rowing Club.

Bittner died of a heart attack in Arcata, California, on March 1, 2026, at the age of 74.
