= Judy Irving =

American film director

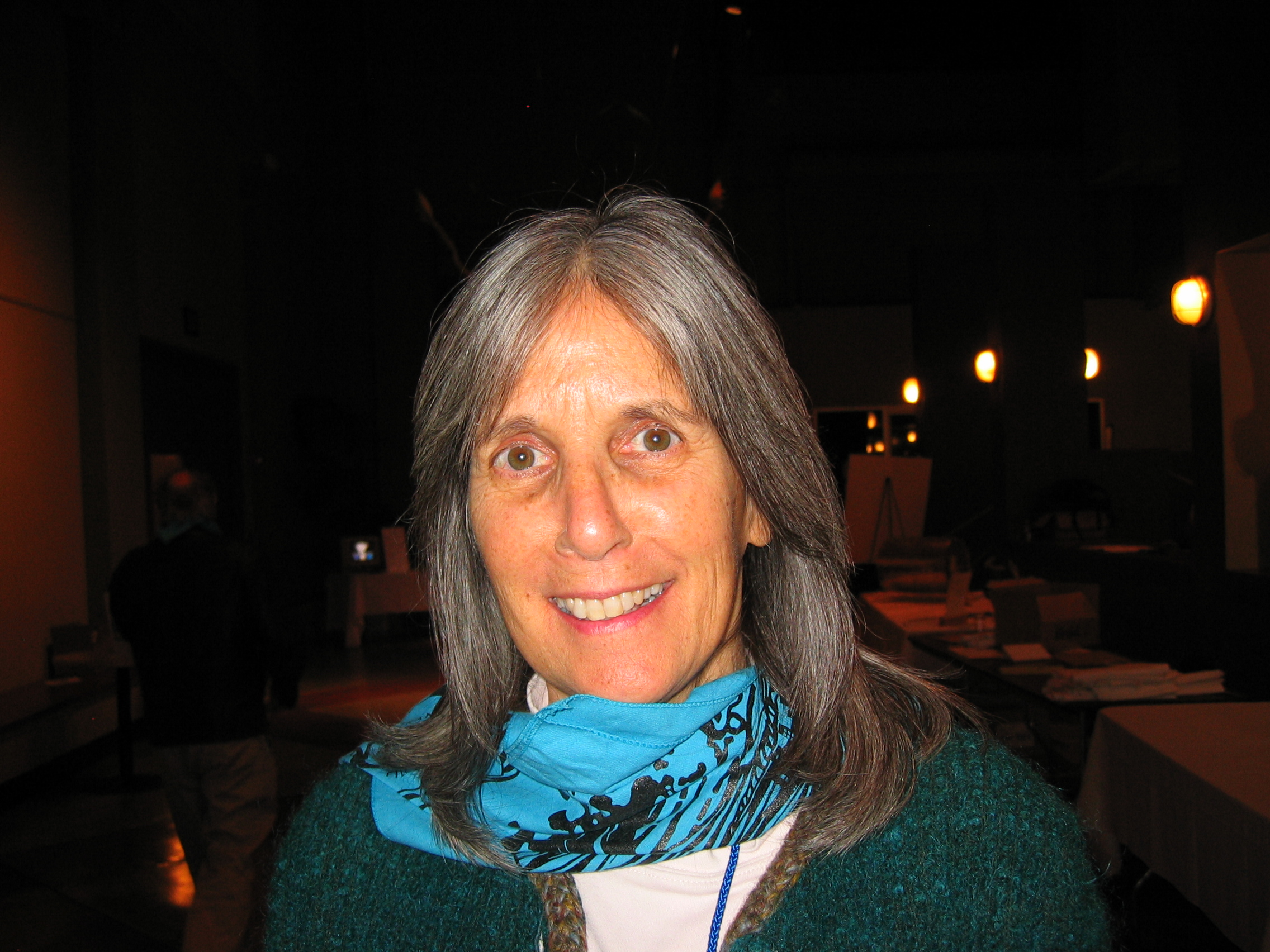
Judy Irving at the San Francisco Ocean Film Festival in 2007

Judy Irving (born in 1946) is an American filmmaker. She directed the documentary The Wild Parrots of Telegraph Hill, about writer Mark Bittner's relationship with a flock of wild parrots. The film won the Genesis Award for "Outstanding Documentary Film" in 2005, and is one of the 25 top-grossing theatrical documentaries of all time with over $3 million in box-office receipts. On May 29, 2007, Parrots was featured on the PBS series Independent Lens.

A previous feature-length film, Dark Circle, won the Grand Prize at the Sundance Film Festival in 1983 as well as a National Emmy Award for "Outstanding Individual Achievement in News and Documentary" in 1990.

Dark Circle was re-mastered and released in 2020. Journalist Yonca Talu interviewed Judy Irving in 2020.

Pelican Dreams, a feature-length film about California brown pelicans and the people who know them best, was released theatrically in 2014.

Judy Irving’s most recent film, Cold Refuge (2023), is her fourth feature-length documentary. The film is about the physical, psychological, and spiritual aspects of full immersion in the natural world: how, though it may seem counter-intuitive, swimming in cold water helps mitigate some of life's most serious challenges. Cold Refuge premiered at the International Ocean Film Festival in San Francisco in April 2023.

Irving earned a Bachelor of Arts degree from Connecticut College in 1968 and a master's degree in from Stanford University in 1973 She received a Guggenheim Fellowship in Film in 1983. In 2006, she married Mark Bittner after the two fell in love during the filming of Parrots.

In 2015 Judy Irving was elected to the Academy of Motion Picture Arts & Sciences Documentary Branch.

She is the executive director of Pelican Media, a San Francisco non-profit which produces environmentally themed films.
