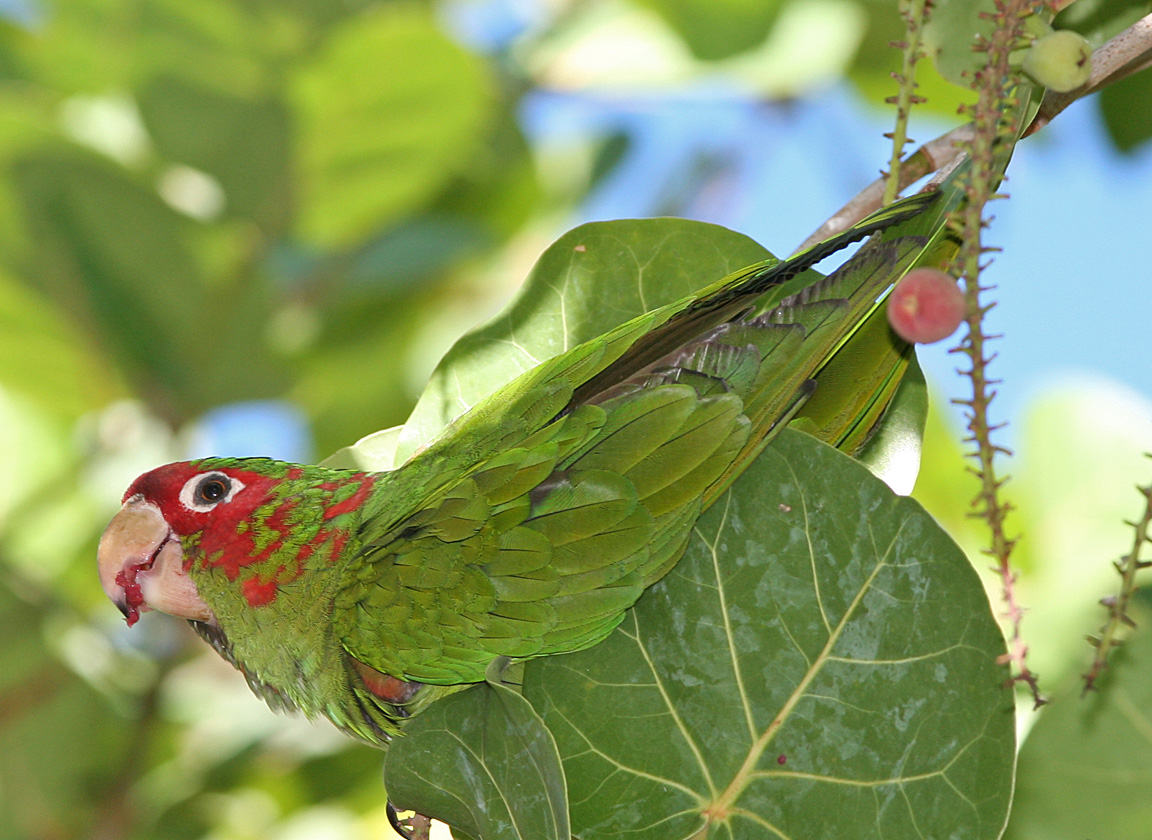
- A feral mitred parakeet in Florida

Conservation status
- Least Concern (IUCN 3.1)
- CITES Appendix II

Scientific classification
- Kingdom: Animalia
- Phylum: Chordata
- Class: Aves
- Order: Psittaciformes
- Family: Psittacidae
- Genus: Psittacara
- Species: P. mitratus

Binomial name
- Psittacara mitratus (Tschudi, 1844)

Synonyms
- Aratinga mitrata

= Mitred parakeet =

Species of bird

The mitred parakeet (Psittacara mitratus), also known as the mitred conure in aviculture, is a species of bird in subfamily Arinae of the family Psittacidae, the African and New World parrots. It is native to Argentina, Bolivia, and Peru. It has been introduced to Uruguay and is established there. There are also substantial populations in the US states of California and Florida and smaller numbers in Hawaii.

== Taxonomy and systematics ==
The mitred parakeet was for a time placed in the genus Aratinga but from about 2013 has been in its present genus Psittacara. Its taxonomy is otherwise unsettled. The International Ornithological Committee (IOC) recognizes these three subspecies:

- P. m. chlorogenys (Arndt, 2006)
- P. m. mitratus (Tschudi, 1844)
- P. m. tucumanus (Arndt, 2006)

The American Ornithological Society (AOS) and the Clements taxonomy recognize a fourth subspecies, P. m. alticola ("Chapman's parakeet"), that Arndt (2006) had suggested as a separate species. Agnolin (2009) called into question the validity of P. m. tucumanus, and BirdLife International's Handbook of the Birds of the World (HBW) does not recognize it or P. m. alticola, assigning only P. m. chlorogenys and P. m. mitratus to the mitred parakeet.

Arndt (2006) also suggested that another full species, P. hockingi ("Hocking's parakeet"), exists within the mitred parakeet. The IOC, AOS, Clements, and HBW have not accepted this taxon as either a species or subspecies.

This article follows the three-subspecies model.

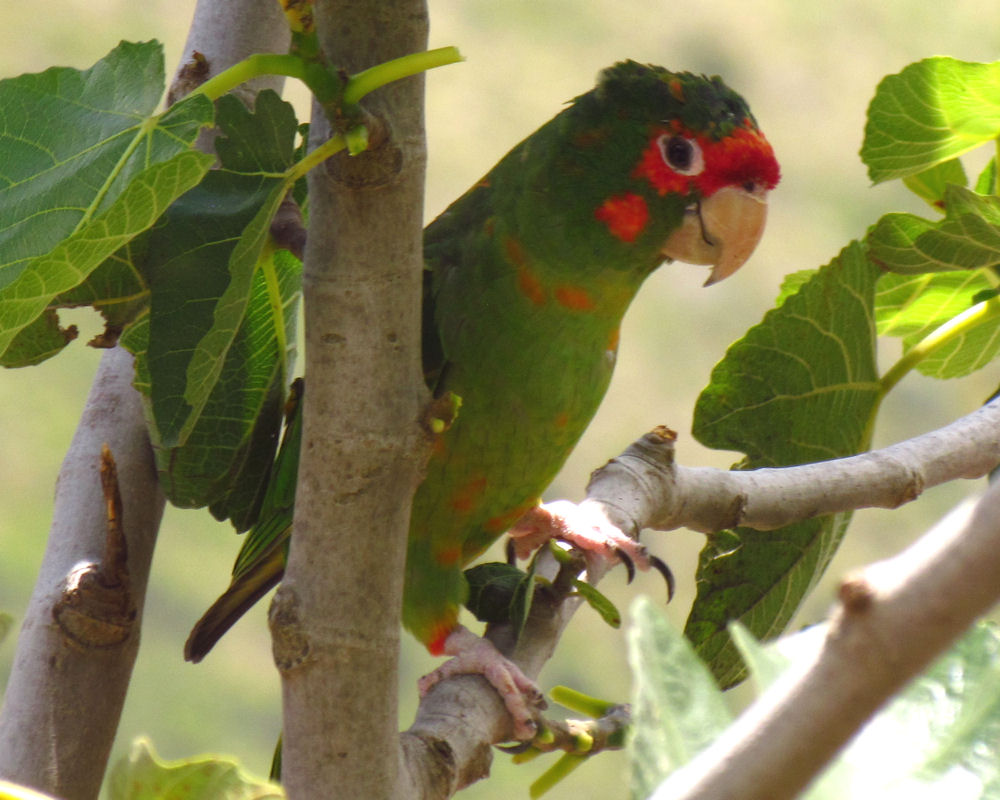
Inka Trail, Peru

== Description ==
The mitred parakeet is 31 to 38 cm (12 to 15 in) long and weighs 219 to 275 g (7.7 to 9.7 oz). The sexes are alike. Adults of all subspecies are mostly green with a purplish forehead and a variable amount and pattern of red on the face. All subspecies have a red forecrown and red in front of their eye. The red usually extends past the eye and down the cheeks, and is often just flecks on the ear coverts. Subspecies P. m. chlorogenys has less red around and below the eye than the others, often a blue tinge on the crown, and some red on the thighs. Some individuals of all subspecies have a small amount of red at the bend of the wing. Their eye is surrounded by bare white skin and their bill is horn colored. Juveniles have little or no red.

The differences in plumage coloration noted in the field and in specimens are possibly due to erroneous age assignments, and might also be clinal.

== Distribution and habitat ==
The nominate subspecies P. m. mitratus of the mitred parakeet is found from the departments of Ayacucho and Cuzco in Peru south through Bolivia into northwestern Argentina as far as Córdoba Province. Subspecies P. m. chlorogenys is found on the eastern slope of the Peruvian Andes between Amazonas and Junín departments. P. m. tucumanus is found in the Argentinian provinces of Córdoba and Tucumán.

The mitred parakeet has been introduced to Uruguay and is established there. Populations in California, Florida, and Hawaii are apparently derived from escaped or released cage birds. California's official list does not include the species but the other two states' lists do.

In their native range mitred parakeets inhabit a variety of landscapes, most of them forested. These include both evergreen and deciduous montane forest, cloudforest, secondary forest, and semi-humid to humid scrub areas in otherwise arid zones. Subspecies P. m. chlorogenys ranges from 1,200 to 2,900 m (3,900 to 9,500 ft) in elevation. The other two subspecies occur in the wider elevational range of 1,000 to 3,400 m (3,300 to 11,200 ft) with one reported sighting at 4,000 m (13,000 ft) in Peru. The introduced populations in California and Florida mostly occur in suburban and urban areas while those in Hawaii occur in both populated and unpopulated areas.

== Behavior ==
=== Movement ===
The mitred parakeet makes some movements in response to food availability and also apparently roams outside the breeding season. Flocks of up to 2000 have been reported though those of about 100 individuals are more common.

=== Feeding ===
The mitred parakeet's diet in its native range has not been fully described but is known to include berries and other fruits, seeds, nuts, and maize. In California the species has been observed feeding on fruits and flowers. In south Florida it has been documented feeding on 34 species of plants, both native and introduced.

=== Breeding ===
In its native range the mitred parakeet nests in tree cavities and on cliffs. Its clutch size in the wild is two to three eggs. In Florida it nests almost exclusively on human structures and in Hawaii has nested on sea cliffs.

=== Vocalization ===
The mitred parakeet is very vocal, especially in flight with "a continuous loud screeching chatter". It also makes nasal "[s]queaky notes and screeches".

== Status ==
The IUCN has assessed the mitred parakeet as being of Least Concern in its native range. It has a large range and though its population size is not known it is believed to be stable. Though it was formerly heavily captured for the cage bird trade, as of 2018 no immediate threats have been identified. It is considered generally common and locally abundant and occurs in several protected areas.

The population of mitred parakeet in California was estimated at 1000 individuals in 2002. That in south Florida has been increasing since at least 2004 and by 2019 had reached at least 400. The population in Hawaii had reached about 200 by 2003; lethal control measures reduced the population to about 30 in 2012. Occasional sightings at widespread sites have continued into the 2020s.

== Aviculture ==
The subspecies seen in American aviculture is Psittacara m. mitrata (though this is labelled with some uncertainty considering the recent developments in the taxonomy). Popular as pets, the mitred parakeets are considered outgoing and playful. They are even used as "watch birds", given their loud, piercing alarm call. Like most parrots, they tend to be devoted to their human owners. They have been known to grow attached to groups rather than individuals. They make great pets for people who will devote their time and money and will understand the birds natural behaviors; screaming, biting, splashing, etc.
