= British Birds =

British Birds could refer to

- British Birds (magazine)
- The British avifauna

== Lists ==
- List of birds of Great Britain
