= Talk Less Say More =

- Also known as: Jell
- Born: Matthew Jennings; Shropshire, England, United Kingdom
- Genres: Electro-pop, op, art-pop, experimental hip hop, ambient
- Instrument(s): Vocals, guitar, synthesisers, programming, koto, guzheng
- Years active: 2003 – present
- Labels: Good Name for a Racehorse Records, Records on Ribs
- Website: http://recordsonribs.com/artists/talklesssaymore/

Talk Less Say More (alias for Matthew Jennings) is an English singer-songwriter based in London, United Kingdom.

== History ==
=== Early work ===
As a student at the University of Leeds, while playing guitar and synthesisers for based experimental pop-metal band The Butterfly, Matthew began creating records under the moniker Talk Less Say More, sometimes collaborating with The Butterfly's bassist Theodore Campbell. These early albums and EPs were mostly distributed to friends as CD-Rs. They included 2003's Vienna Circles, a reference to the Vienna Circle, 2004's ambient Five Caveats or Beseeching at the Portal of the Soft Source and 2004's Things To Do With Your Hands at Parties, named after sight-gag in The Simpsons.

In 2006, Good Name for a Racehorse Records released Meisha's Morning. Featuring vocal performances from soprano Erika Mädi Jones, Meisha's Morning combined operatic vocals with ambience, glitch beats and a trip-hop sensibility that reviewers considered "an altogether more considered, computer-based work" compared to his work with The Butterfly and "a refreshingly different electronica record". Tracks from the album were played on Radio 3's experimental music programme Mixing It.

=== Electro-pop and experimentation ===
Moving to online record label Records on Ribs in 2008 Talk Less Say More released Go Lucky, the first record to attract critical attention. Go Lucky featured for the first time Matthew's sung vocals (lyrics had previously mostly been rapped) moving into sparse electro-pop influenced at times by minimal techno. Contact Music called Go Lucky "a gorgeous record, detailing the last gasps of a failing relationship with great stoicism and attention to detail" with Line of Best Fit saying "his solo project is a long way from his metal band days in Leeds...Jell's vocals have a warmth reminiscent of confessional romantic folk tales, but the rhythm is more akin to minimalist techno" concluding "When as much attention to detail is paid as Jell himself clearly paid recording and producing this album you can appreciate it for the beautiful experiment that it is". Songs recorded in this period but left off the album were released in 2009's I Don't Know Where I Am, I Don't Know What I'm Doing which featured alternative versions of tracks.

Four further releases were made on Records on Ribs. On its debut in 2007 the label released Ideal Forms, an hour long ambient album and a double album of experimental short form pieces So, How Does It Feel To Be Educated?.

2009 saw the release of an album proper in ‘It's About Time’, an experimental hip-hop record inspired by philosophy of time and featuring a song about the life of physicist Ludwig Boltzmann. 2010 saw the release of Proof Rock, an album inspired by Matthew moving to London and the work of T.S. Eliot.

=== Three Birds Trilogy ===
Beginning with 2012's England Without Rain, Talk Less Say More's "three birds" trilogy represented a stylistic evolution and an expanded musical palette. The "three birds trilogy" were intended to be an attempt at making pop music that was perhaps reminiscent of the spirit of art-pop of the 1970s and 80s but in the present day with present-day instrumentation: deliberately mainstream, wholly embracing mainstream influences while attempting stylistic and lyrical experimentalism. The name "three birds" refers to the British birds depicted on the front covers of the records.

The Quietus commented that England Without Rain "does for homemade electro-pop what Heston Blumenthal once did for the menu at a Little Chef off the A303 near Basingstoke: tarts it up good and proper with a combination of modern technological wizardry and impeccable taste" adding that "England Without Rain is an album with such a surfeit of ideas and imagination that one almost feels that it's not really fair". Stressing its uniqueness and pop sensibility Contact Music said that "The greatest praise that can be given to England Without Rain is that there really is nothing out there quite like it". No Ripchord noted that, however, "the phrase 'pop' is to be taken with a pinch of salt – what I mean is that Jennings has striven to expand his sonic palette without compromising his knack for creating catchy pop melodies and structures" yet that "there isn't a weak track on the album – each has a distinct theme which fits into a cohesive yet re-inventive whole".

This was followed in 2014's Violent, described as "musically is every bit the equal of its predecessor. Excellent pop hooks, some surprising twists, and a level of musical invention rarely afforded to pop / rock artists these days". Despite an increase in the records sonic palette compared to its predecessor, Violent was said to never lose its "way in his search for a crafty tune and this is reliably melodic, eclectic and fun synth-pop with its tongue firmly in cheek".

The third and last part, Bonfire Night, was released in April 2017.

== Discography ==
Year	Title	Released As	Record label
2003	Vienna Circles	Talk Less, Say More	Self-released
2004	Five Caveats or Beseeching at the Portal of the Soft Source	Talk Less, Say More and Coruschord	Self-released
2004	Things to Do With Your Hands at Parties	Talk Less, Say More	Self-released
2006	Meisha's Morning	Talk Less Say More	Good Name for a Racehorse Records
2008	Ideal Forms	Talk Less, Say More	Records on Ribs
2008	So, How Does It Feel To Be Educated?	Talk Less, Say More and Coruschord	Records on Ribs
2008	Go Lucky	Talk Less, Say More	Records on Ribs
2009	'It's About Time'	Talk Less, Say More	Records on Ribs
2009	I Don't Know Where I Am, I Don't Know What I'm Doing	Talk Less, Say More	Records on Ribs
2010	Proof Rock	Talk Less, Say More	Records on Ribs
2012	England Without Rain	Talk Less, Say More	Records on Ribs
2014	Violent	Talk Less Say More	Records on Ribs
2017	Bonfire Night	Talk Less Say More	Records on Ribs
