= List of birds of Wales =

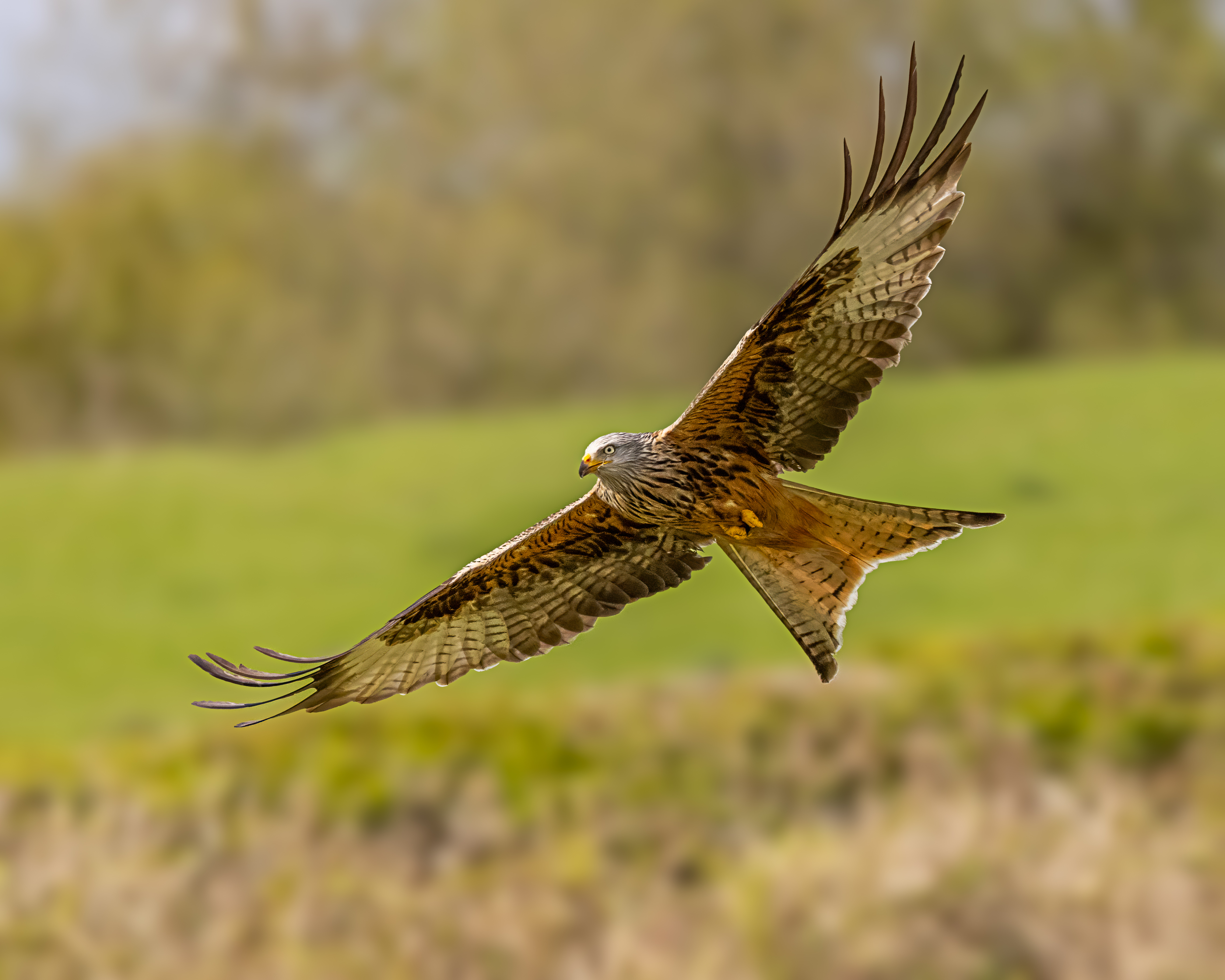
Red kite, often considered to be the national bird of Wales.

This list of birds of Wales includes every species of bird that has been recorded in a wild state in Wales. Compared to the avifauna of Britain as a whole, Wales has fewer breeding species, but these include a number of moorland species such as red grouse and black grouse, large numbers of seabirds (particularly on offshore islands such as Skomer, Grassholm and Bardsey) and good populations of several species typical of Welsh oak woods including redstart, pied flycatcher and wood warbler. Among the birds of prey is the red kite, which had become extinct in other parts of Britain until being reintroduced recently. In winter many wildfowl and waders are found around the coast, attracted by the mild temperatures. In spring and autumn a variety of migrant and vagrant birds can be seen, particularly on headlands and islands. Three-quarters of the UK population of the red-billed chough resides in Wales.

The list is based on Birds in Wales (Lovegrove et al. 1994), Birds in Wales 1992–2022 (Green 2022) and the list of the Welsh Ornithological Society (Prater & Thorpe 2006) with updates from the Welsh Records Panel's annual reports. The taxonomy and scientific names follow the official list of the British Ornithologists' Union (BOU). The English names are the vernacular names used in the 7th edition of the BOU list with the standardized names from that list given in brackets where they differ. The family introductions are based on The New Encyclopedia of Birds (Perrins 2004) except where otherwise stated.

Certain categories of birds are noted with the following tags:

- (A) Accidental - a species that rarely or accidentally occurs in Wales
- (I) Introduced - a species introduced to Wales as a consequence, direct or indirect, of human actions

The total number of species on the list is 463 and 10 introduced species. About 150 species breed annually.

== Ducks, geese and swans ==
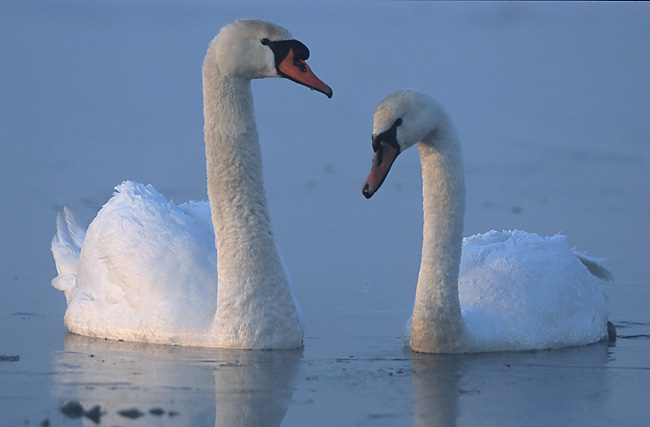
A pair of mute swans, a resident bird of lowland waters

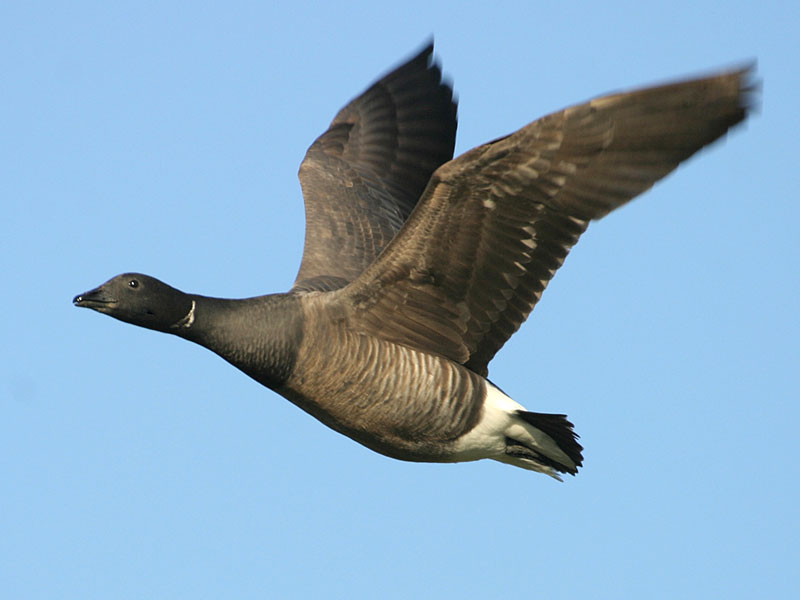
Brent goose of the dark-bellied race B. b. bernicla, a winter visitor mainly to the Burry Inlet

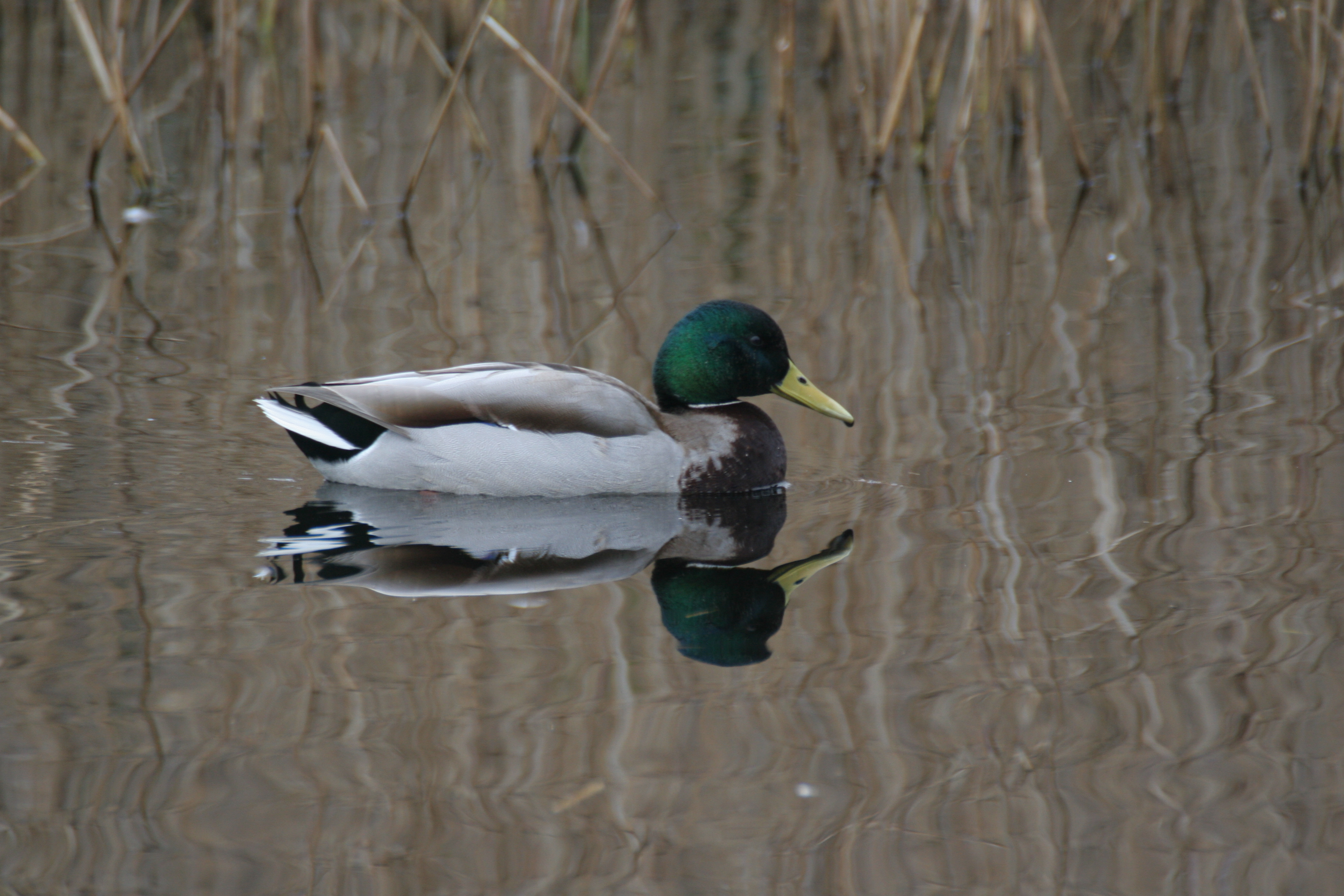
Mallard, the commonest and most widespread duck

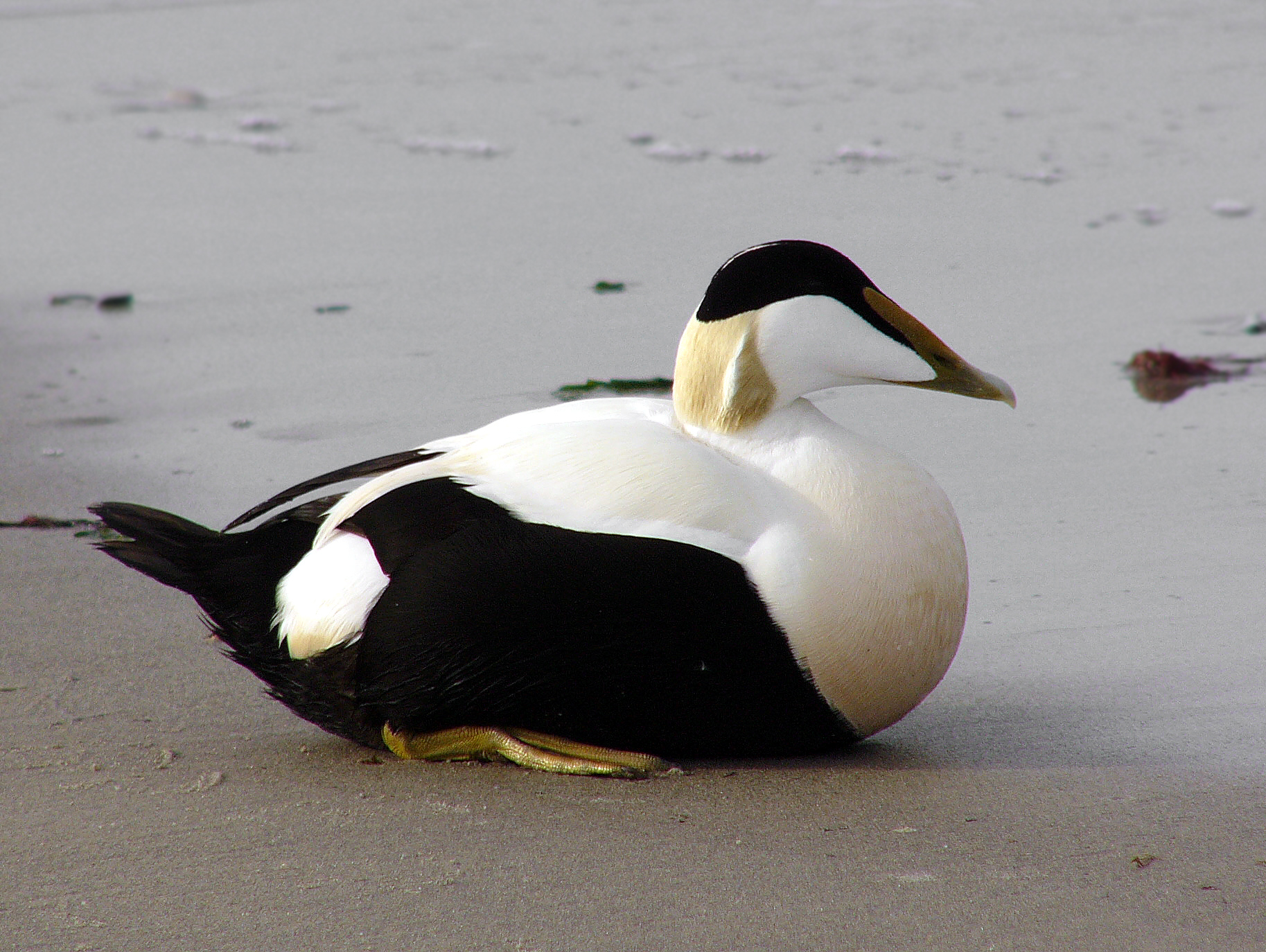
Eider, small numbers winter around the coast and breeding was recorded for the first time in 1997.

Order: Anseriformes Family: Anatidae

The swans, ducks and geese are medium to large birds that are adapted to an aquatic existence with webbed feet and bills which are flattened to a greater or lesser extent. In many ducks the male is colourful while the female is dull brown. The diet consists of a variety of animals and plants. The family is well represented in Wales, especially in winter when large numbers visit from Greenland, Scandinavia and Russia.

Common name	Binomial	Status
Brent goose	Branta bernicla	
Red-breasted goose	Branta ruficollis	
Canada goose	Branta canadensis	I
Barnacle goose	Branta leucopsis	
Greylag goose	Anser anser	
Taiga bean goose	Anser fabalis	(A)
Pink-footed goose	Anser brachyrhynchus	
Tundra bean goose	Anser serrirostris	(A)
White-fronted goose	Anser albifrons	
Lesser white-fronted goose	Anser erythropus	(A)
Mute swan	Cygnus olor	
Bewick's swan	Cygnus columbianus	
Whooper swan	Cygnus cygnus	
Egyptian goose	Alopochen aegyptiacus	I
Shelduck	Tadorna tadorna	
Ruddy shelduck	Tadorna ferruginea	(A)
Mandarin duck	Aix galericulata	I
Garganey	Spatula querquedula	
Blue-winged teal	Spatula discors	(A)
Shoveler	Spatula clypeata	
Gadwall	Mareca strepera	
Falcated duck	Mareca falcata	
Wigeon	Anas penelope	
American wigeon	Mareca americana	(A)
Mallard	Anas platyrhynchos	
Black duck	Anas rubripes	(A)
Pintail	Anas acuta	
Teal	Anas crecca	
Green-winged teal	Anas carolinensis	(A)
Red-crested pochard	Netta rufina	I
Pochard	Aythya ferina	
Ferruginous duck	Aythya nyroca	(A)
Ring-necked duck	Aythya collaris	(A)
Tufted duck	Aythya fuligula	
Scaup	Aythya marila	
Lesser scaup	Aythya affinis	(A)
King eider	Somateria spectabilis	(A)
Eider	Somateria mollissima	
Surf scoter	Melanitta perspicillata	(A)
Velvet scoter	Melanitta fusca	
Common scoter	Melanitta nigra	
Black scoter	Melanitta americana	(A)
Long-tailed duck	Clangula hyemalis	
Goldeneye	Bucephala clangula	
Smew	Mergellus albellus	
Hooded merganser	Lophodytes cucullatus	(A)
Goosander	Mergus merganser	
Red-breasted merganser	Mergus serrator	
Ruddy duck	Oxyura jamaicensis	I

== Pheasants, grouse, and allies ==
Order: Galliformes Family: Phasianidae

These are terrestrial species, feeding and nesting on the ground. They are variable in size but generally plump, with broad and relatively short wings.

Common name	Binomial	Status
Red grouse	Lagopus lagopus	
Black grouse	Lyrurus tetrix	
Grey partridge	Perdix perdix	
Pheasant	Phasianus colchicus	I
Quail	Coturnix coturnix	
Red-legged partridge	Alectorix rufa	I

== Nightjars and allies ==
Order: Caprimulgiformes Family: Caprimulgidae

Nightjars are medium-sized nocturnal birds that usually nest on the ground. They have long wings, short legs and very short bills. Their soft plumage is cryptically coloured to resemble bark or leaves.

Common name	Binomial	Status
Common nighthawk	Chordeiles minor	(A)
Nightjar	Caprimulgus europaeus	

== Swifts ==
Order: Apodiformes Family: Apodidae

The swifts are small birds which spend the majority of their lives flying. These birds have very short legs and never settle voluntarily on the ground, perching instead only on vertical surfaces.

Common name	Binomial	Status
Chimney swift	Chaetura pelagica	(A)
Alpine swift	Apus melba	(A)
Swift	Apus apus	
Pallid swift	Apus pallidus	(A)
Little swift	Apus affinis	(A)

== Bustards ==
Order: Otidiformes Family: Otididae

Large, sturdy birds of open plains with long legs and necks and strong feet.

Common name	Binomial	Status
Great bustard	Otis tarda	(A)
Little bustard	Tetrax tetrax	(A)

== Cuckoos ==
Order: Cuculiformes Family: Cuculidae

Birds of variable size with slender bodies and long tails. Some species are known for laying their eggs in the nests of other birds.

Common name	Binomial	Status
Great spotted cuckoo	Clamator glandarius	(A)
Yellow-billed cuckoo	Coccyzus americanus	(A)
Cuckoo	Cuculus canorus	

== Sandgrouse ==
Order: Pterocliformes Family: Pteroclidae

Sturdy, medium-sized birds with a small head and long, pointed wings.

Common name	Binomial	Status
Pallas's sandgrouse	Syrrhaptes paradoxus	(A)

== Pigeons and doves ==
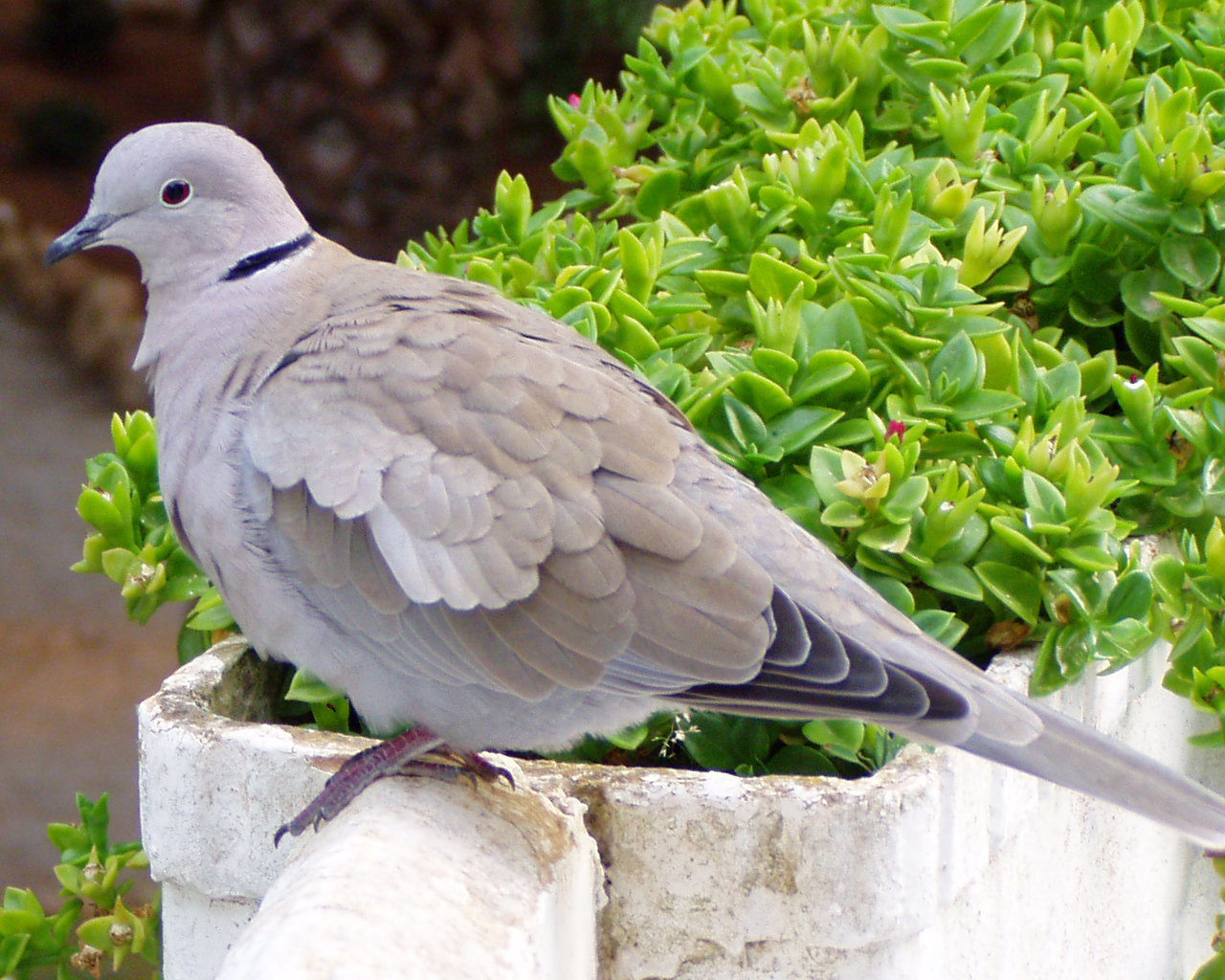
Collared dove, first recorded in 1959 and now a common resident.

Order: Columbiformes Family: Columbidae

Pigeons and doves are stout-bodied birds with short necks and short slender bills with a fleshy cere.

Common name	Binomial	Status
Rock dove	Columba livia	
Stock dove	Columba oenas	
Woodpigeon	Columba palumbus	
Turtle dove	Streptopelia turtur	
Collared dove	Streptopelia decaocto	

== Rails, gallinules, and coots ==
Order: Gruiformes Family: Rallidae

These birds mainly occupy dense vegetation in damp environments near lakes, marshes or rivers. Many are shy and secretive birds, making them difficult to observe. Most species have strong legs and long toes which are well adapted to soft uneven surfaces.

Common name	Binomial	Status
Water rail	Rallus aquaticus	
Corncrake	Crex crex	(A)
Sora	Porzana carolina	(A)
Spotted crake	Porzana porzana	(A)
Moorhen	Gallinula chloropus	
Coot	Fulica atra	
Baillon's crake	Porzana pusilla	(A)
Little crake	Porzana parva	(A)

== Cranes ==
Order: Gruiformes Family: Gruidae

Cranes are large, long-legged and long-necked birds. Unlike the similar-looking but unrelated herons, cranes fly with necks outstretched, not pulled back. Most have elaborate and noisy courting displays or "dances".

Common name	Binomial	Status
Crane	Grus grus	(A)

== Grebes ==
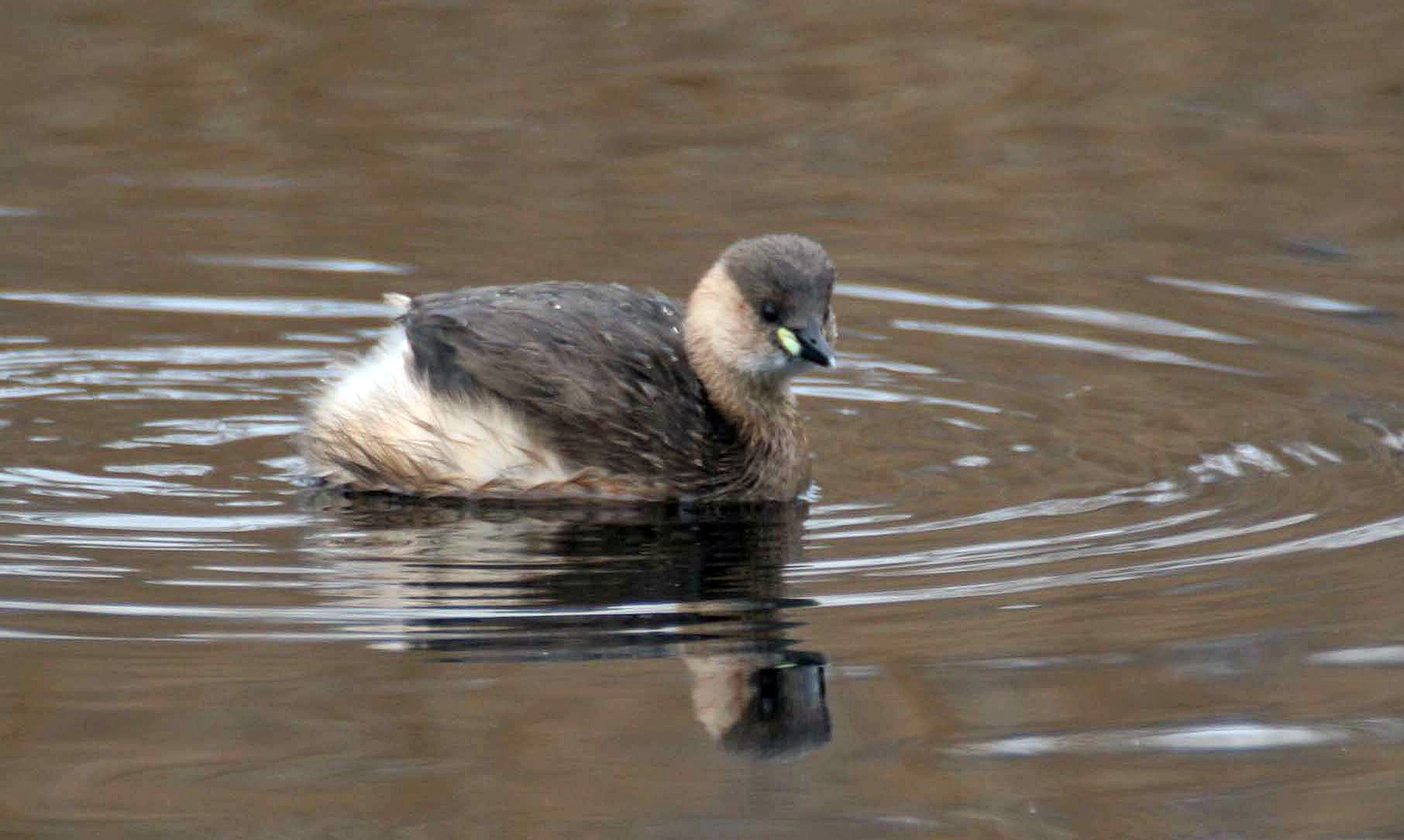
Little grebe, breeds locally on well-vegetated water bodies

Order: Podicipediformes Family: Podicipedidae

Grebes are small to medium-large diving birds with lobed toes and pointed bills. They are seen mainly on lowland waterbodies and coasts. They feed on aquatic animals and nest on a floating platform of vegetation.

Common name	Binomial	Status
Little grebe	Tachybaptus ruficollis	
Pied-billed grebe	Podilymbus podiceps	(A)
Red-necked grebe	Podiceps grisegena	
Great crested grebe	Podiceps cristatus	
Slavonian grebe	Podiceps auritus	
Black-necked grebe	Podiceps nigricollis	

== Stone-curlews ==
Order: Charadriiformes Family: Burhinidae

A small family of medium to large waders with strong black bills, large yellow eyes and cryptic plumage.

Common name	Binomial	Status
Stone-curlew	Burhinus oedicnemus	(A)

== Oystercatchers ==
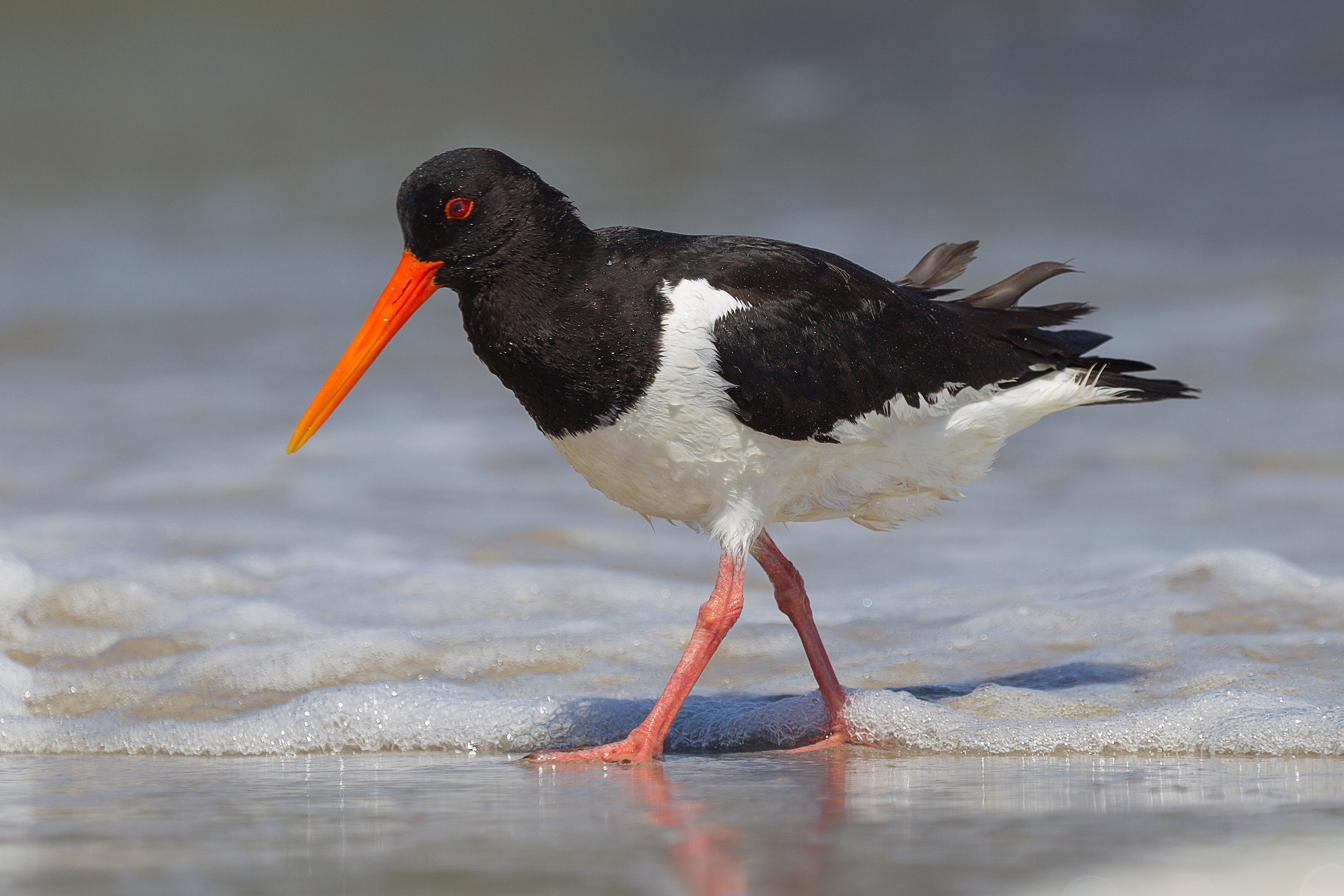
Oystercatcher, common in coastal areas.

Order: Charadriiformes Family: Haematopodidae

The oystercatchers are large, obvious and noisy wading birds with strong bills used for smashing or prising open molluscs.

Common name	Binomial	Status
Oystercatcher	Haematopus ostralegus	

== Stilts and avocets ==
Order: Charadriiformes Family: Recurvirostridae

A family of fairly large wading birds. The avocets have long legs and long up-curved bills. The stilts have extremely long legs and long, thin, straight bills.

Common name	Binomial	Status
Black-winged stilt	Himantopus himantopus	(A)
Avocet	Recurvirostra avosetta	

== Plovers and lapwings ==
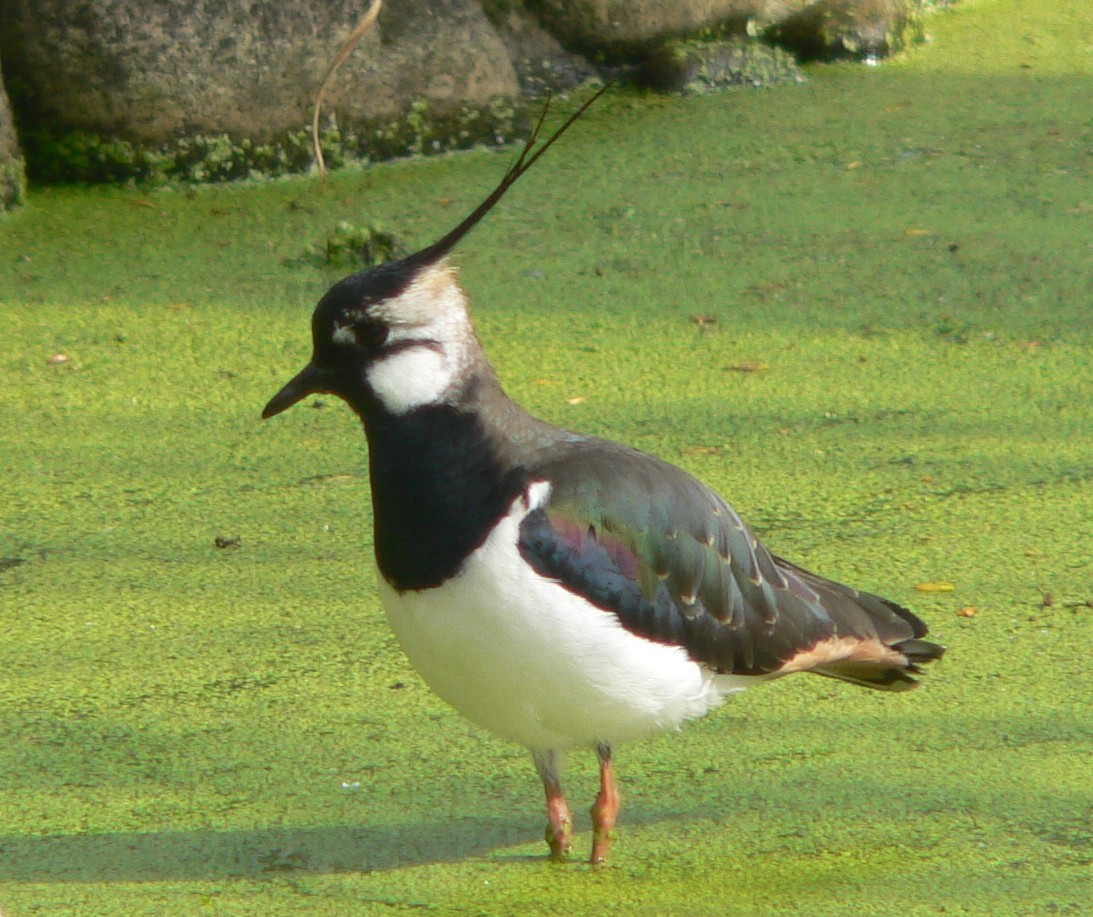
Lapwing, seriously declining as a breeding species.

Order: Charadriiformes Family: Charadriidae

Small to medium-sized wading birds with compact bodies, short, thick necks and long, usually pointed, wings.

Common name	Binomial	Status
Lapwing	Vanellus vanellus	
Sociable plover	Vanellus gregarius	(A)
Golden plover	Pluvialis apricaria	
Pacific golden plover	Pluvialis fulva	(A)
American golden plover	Pluvialis dominica	(A)
Grey plover	Pluvialis squatarola	
Ringed plover	Charadrius hiaticula	
Little ringed plover	Charadrius dubius	
Killdeer	Charadrius vociferus	(A)
Kentish plover	Charadrius alexandrinus	(A)
Greater sand plover	Charadrius leschenaultii	(A)
Dotterel	Charadrius morinellus	

== Sandpipers and allies ==
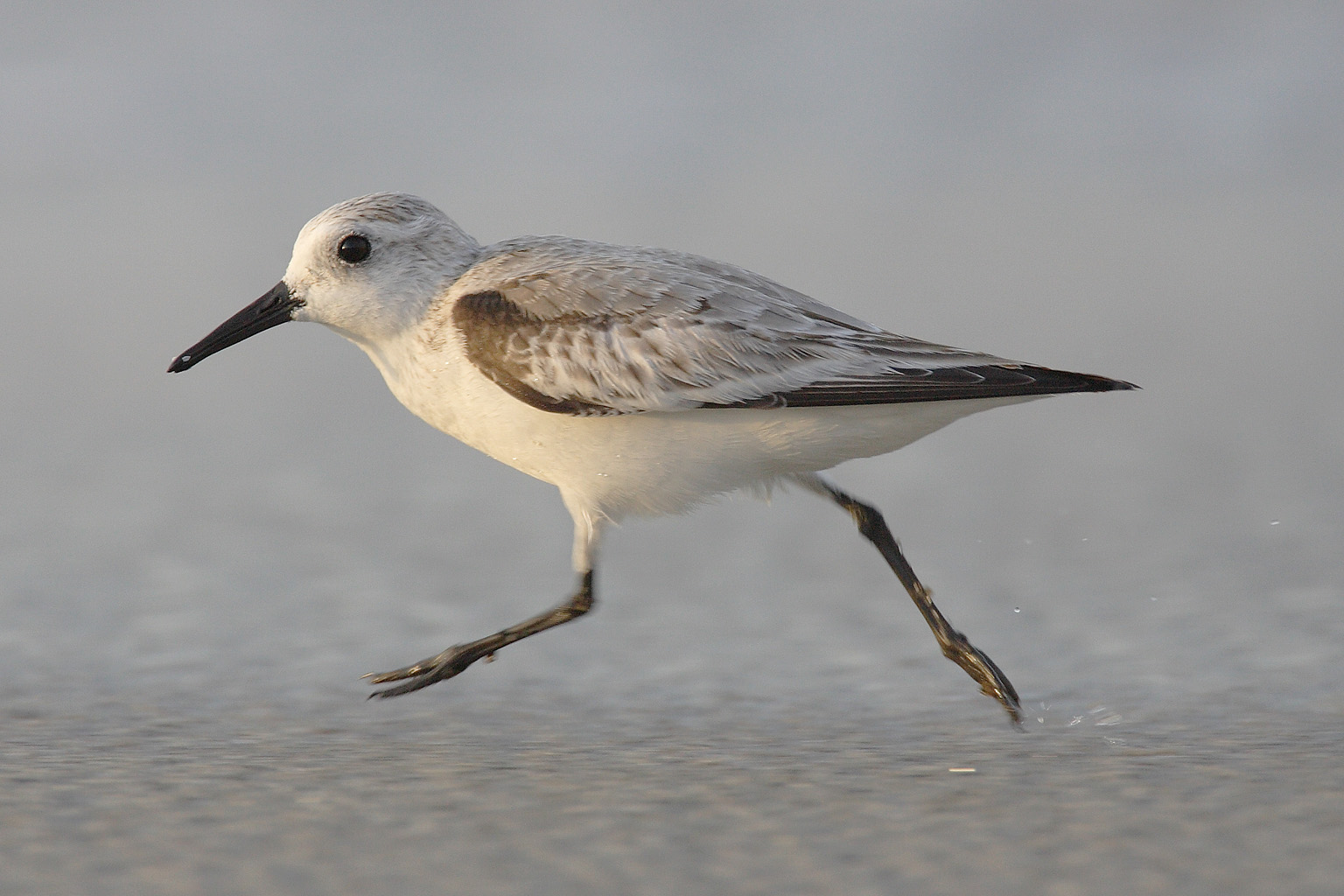
Sanderling, a winter visitor and passage migrant, mainly on sandy shores

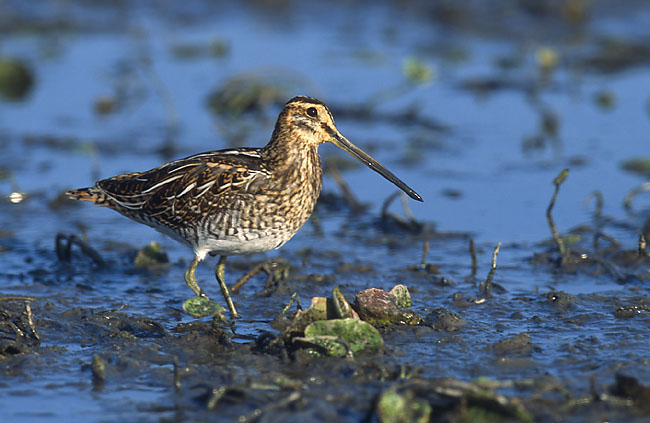
Snipe, declining like many breeding waders

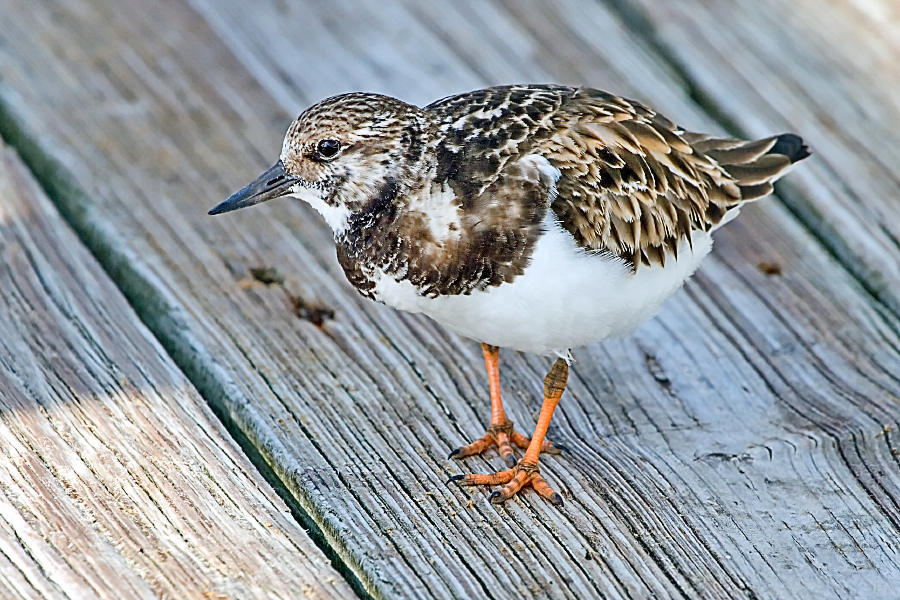
Turnstone, a non-breeding species but some are present on rocky coasts all year round.

Order: Charadriiformes Family: Scolopacidae

A large, diverse family of wading birds. Different lengths of legs and bills enable multiple species to feed in the same habitat, particularly on the coast, without direct competition for food.

Common name	Binomial	Status
Upland sandpiper	Bartramia longicauda	(A)
Whimbrel	Numenius phaeopus	
Hudsonian whimbrel	Numenius hudsonicus	(A)
Little whimbrel	Numenius minutus	(A)
Curlew	Numenius arquata	
Bar-tailed godwit	Limosa lapponica	
Black-tailed godwit	Limosa limosa	
Turnstone	Arenaria interpres	
Knot	Calidris canutus	
Ruff	Calidris pugnax	
Broad-billed sandpiper	Calidris falcinellus	(A)
Sharp-tailed sandpiper	Calidris acuminata	(A)
Stilt sandpiper	Calidris himantopus	(A)
Curlew sandpiper	Calidris ferruginea	
Temminck's stint	Calidris temminckii	(A)
Sanderling	Calidris alba	
Dunlin	Calidris alpina	
Purple sandpiper	Calidris maritima	
Baird's sandpiper	Calidris bairdii	(A)
Little stint	Calidris minuta	
Least sandpiper	Calidris minutilla	(A)
White-rumped sandpiper	Calidris fuscicollis	(A)
Buff-breasted sandpiper	Calidris subruficollis	(A)
Pectoral sandpiper	Calidris melanotos	(A)
Semipalmated sandpiper	Calidris pusilla	(A)
Long-billed dowitcher	Limnodromus scolopaceus	
Woodcock	Scolopax rusticola	
Jack snipe	Lymnocryptes minimus	
Great snipe	Gallinago minima	(A)
Snipe	Gallinago gallinago	
Terek sandpiper	Xenus cinerea	(A)
Wilson's phalarope	Phalaropus tricolor	(A)
Red-necked phalarope	Phalaropus lobatus	(A)
Grey phalarope	Phalaropus fulicarius	
Common sandpiper	Actitis hypoleucos	
Spotted sandpiper	Tringa macularius	(A)
Green sandpiper	Tringa ochropus	
Grey-tailed tattler	Tringa brevipes	(A)
Lesser yellowlegs	Tringa flavipes	(A)
Redshank	Tringa totanus	
Marsh sandpiper	Tringa stagnatilis	(A)
Wood sandpiper	Tringa glareola	
Spotted redshank	Tringa erythropus	
Greenshank	Tringa nebularia	
Greater yellowlegs	Tringa melanoleuca	(A)

== Pratincoles and coursers ==
Order: Charadriiformes Family: Glareolidae

A family of slender, long-winged wading birds.

Common name	Binomial	Status
Cream-coloured courser	Cursorius cursor	(A)
Collared pratincole	Glareola pratincola	(A)
Black-winged pratincole	Glareola nordmanni	(A)

== Gulls, terns, and skimmers ==
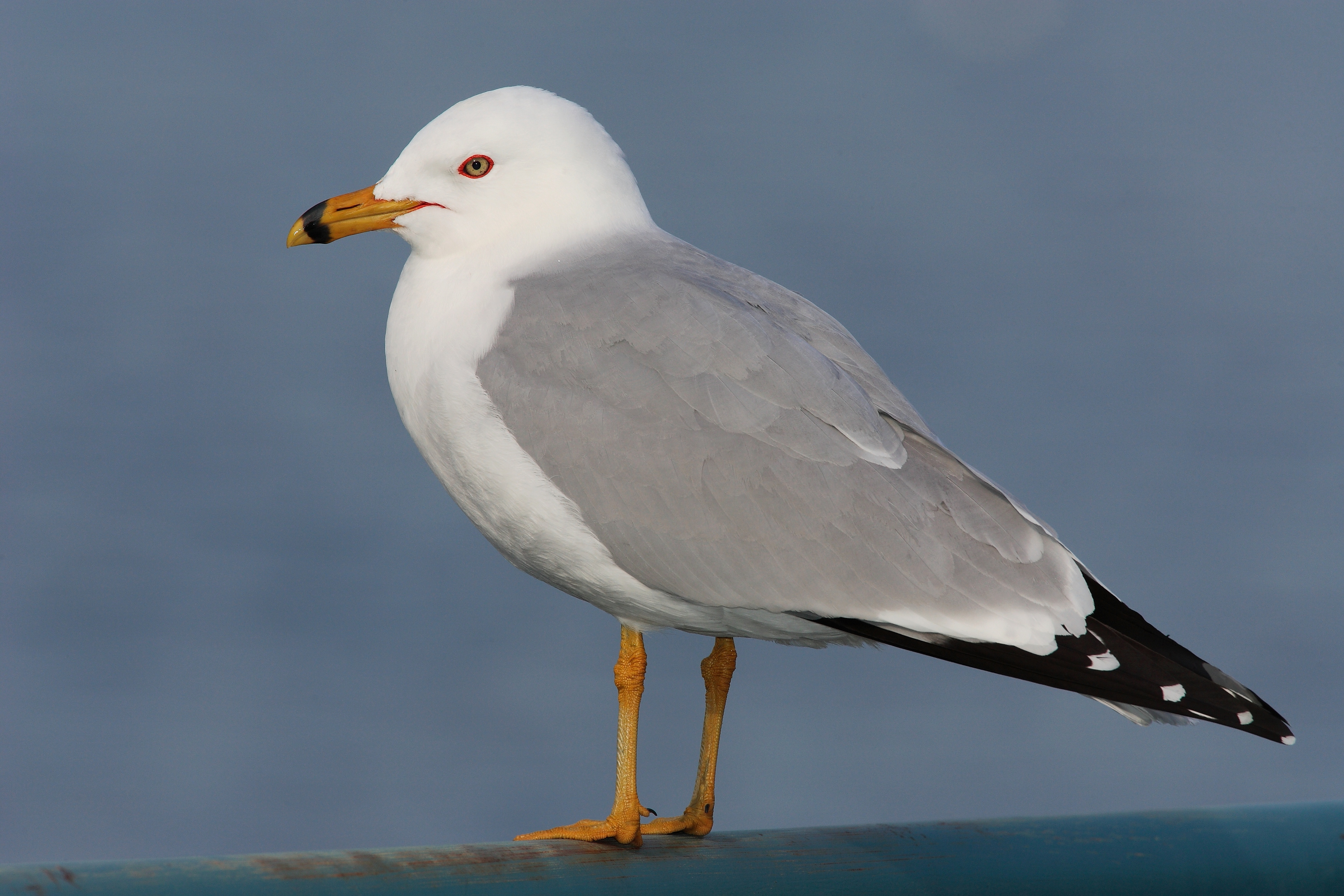
Ring-billed gull, the first British record of this American species was in Wales in 1973. It now occurs annually.

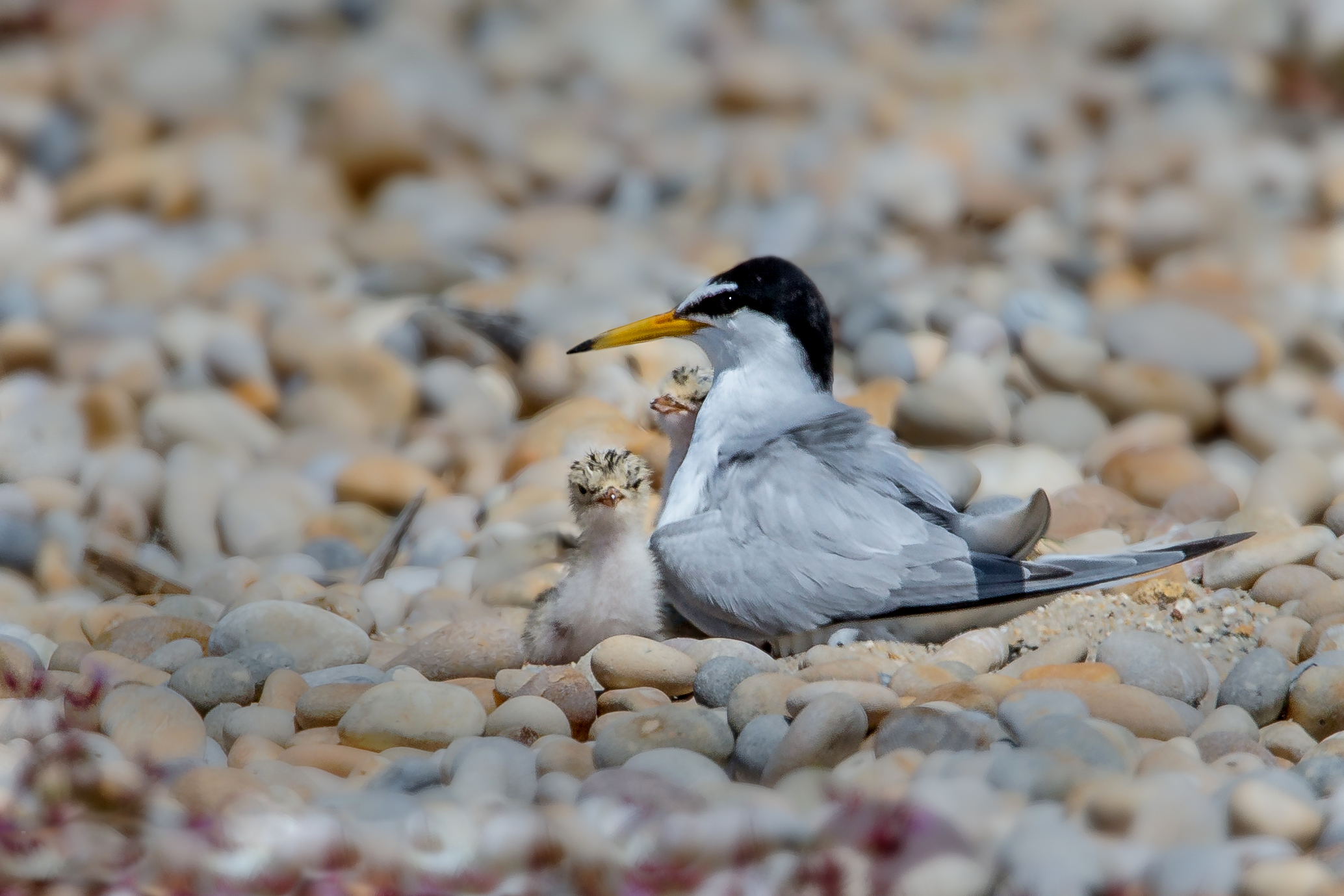
Little tern, only a single colony remains in Wales at Gronant in the north-east.

Order: Charadriiformes Family: Laridae

Medium to large seabirds with grey, white and black plumage, webbed feet and strong bills. Many are opportunistic and adaptable feeders.

Common name	Binomial	Status
Kittiwake	Rissa tridactyla	
Ivory gull	Pagophila eburnea	(A)
Sabine's gull	Xema sabini	
Bonaparte's gull	Chroicocephalus philadelphia	(A)
Black-headed gull	Chroicocephalus ridibundus	
Little gull	Hydrocoloeus minutus	
Ross's gull	Rhodostethia rosea	(A)
Laughing gull	Leucophaeus atricilla	(A)
Franklin's gull	Leucophaeus pipixcan	(A)
Mediterranean gull	Ichthyaetus melanocephalus	
Common gull	Larus canus	
Ring-billed gull	Larus delawarensis	
Great black-backed gull	Larus marinus	
Glaucous-winged gull	Larus glaucescens	(A)
Glaucous gull	Larus hyperboreus	
Iceland gull	Larus glaucoides	
Herring gull	Larus argentatus	
Caspian gull	Larus cachinnans	(A)
Yellow-legged gull	Larus michahellis	(A)
Lesser black-backed gull	Larus fuscus	
Gull-billed tern	Gelochelidon nilotica	(A)
Caspian tern	Hydroprogne caspia	(A)
Royal tern	Thalasseus maximus	(A)
Lesser crested tern	Thalasseus bengalensis	(A)
Sandwich tern	Thalasseus sandvicensis	
Elegant tern	Thalasseus elegans	(A)
Little tern	Sternula albifrons	
Bridled tern	Onychoprion anaethetus	(A)
Sooty tern	Onychoprion fuscatus	(A)
Roseate tern	Sterna dougallii	
Common tern	Sterna hirundo	
Arctic tern	Sterna paradisaea	
Forster's tern	Sterna forsteri	(A)
Whiskered tern	Chlidonias hybrida	(A)
White-winged black tern	Chlidonias leucoptera	(A)
Black tern	Chlidonias niger	

== Skuas ==
Order: Charadriiformes Family: Stercorariidae

Medium to large seabirds with mainly grey or brown plumage, sharp claws and a hooked tip to the bill. They chase other seabirds to force them to drop their catches.

Common name	Binomial	Status
South polar skua	Stercorarius maccormicki	
Great skua	Stercorarius skua	
Pomarine skua	Stercorarius pomarinus	
Arctic skua	Stercorarius parasiticus	
Long-tailed skua	Stercorarius longicaudus	

== Auks, murres, and puffins ==
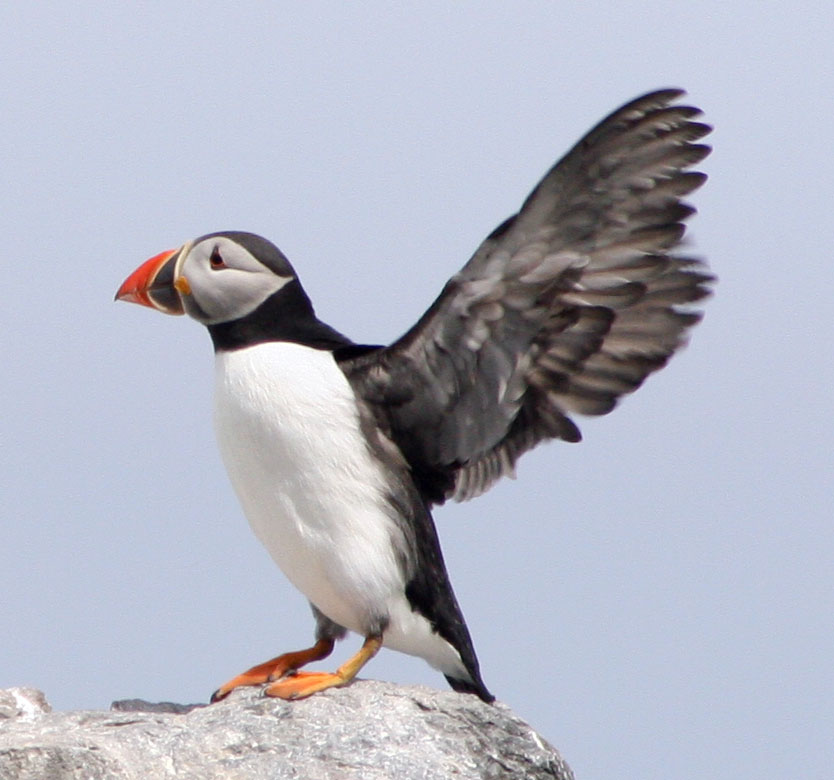
Puffin, breeds on islands and headlands; the largest colonies are on Skomer and Skokholm.

Order: Charadriiformes Family: Alcidae

A family of seabirds which are superficially similar to penguins with their black-and-white colours, their upright posture and some of their habits but which are able to fly. Great auks are extinct.

Common name	Binomial	Status
Little auk	Alle alle	
Common guillemot	Uria aalge	
Razorbill	Alca torda	
Black guillemot	Cepphus grylle	
Puffin	Fratercula arctica	

== Divers ==
Order: Gaviiformes Family: Gaviidae

Divers are aquatic birds the size of a large duck, to which they are unrelated. They swim well and fly adequately but are almost hopeless on land, because their legs are placed towards the rear of the body. They feed on fish and other aquatic animals. They are all non-breeding visitors in Wales.

Common name	Binomial	Status
Red-throated diver	Gavia stellata	
Black-throated diver	Gavia arctica	
Great northern diver	Gavia immer	
White-billed diver	Gavia adamsii	(A)

== Southern storm petrels ==
Order: Procellariiformes Family: Oceanitidae

The austral storm petrels are the smallest seabirds, feeding on plankton and small fish picked from the surface, typically while hovering. They nest in colonies on the ground, most often in burrows.

Common name	Binomial	Status
Wilson's storm petrel	Oceanites oceanicus	(A)

== Albatrosses ==
Order: Procellariiformes Family: Diomedeidae

The albatrosses are among the largest flying birds with long, narrow wings for gliding. The majority are found in the Southern Hemisphere with only vagrants occurring in the North Atlantic.

Common name	Binomial	Status
Black-browed albatross	Thalassarche melanophris	(A)

== Northern storm petrels ==
Order: Procellariiformes Family: Hydrobatidae

The northern storm petrels are the smallest seabirds, feeding on plankton and small fish picked from the surface, typically while hovering. They nest in colonies on the ground, most often in burrows.

Common name	Binomial	Status
Storm petrel	Hydrobates pelagicus	
Leach's petrel	Hydrobates leucorrhous	

== Petrels and shearwaters ==
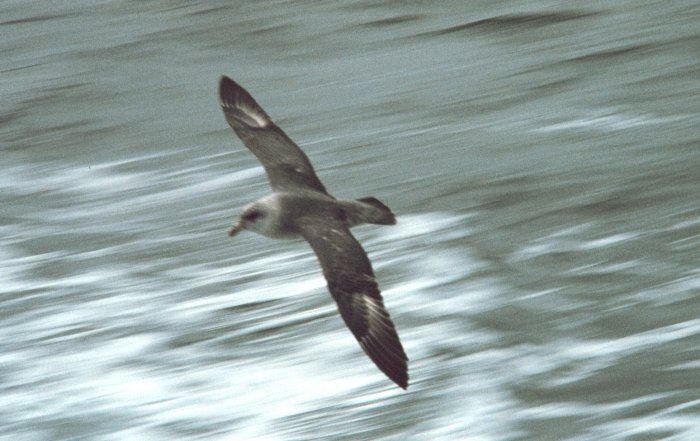
The fulmar first bred in Wales in the 1940s and is now common on sea cliffs.

Order: Procellariiformes Family: Procellariidae

These are highly pelagic birds with long, narrow wings and tube-shaped nostrils. They feed at sea on fish, squid and other marine life. They come to land to breed in colonies, nesting in burrows or on cliffs.

Common name	Binomial	Status
Fulmar	Fulmarus glacialis	
Cory's shearwater	Calonectris borealis	(A)
Sooty shearwater	Ardenna griseus	
Great shearwater	Ardenna gravis	(A)
Manx shearwater	Puffinus puffinus	
Balearic shearwater	Puffinus mauretanicus	
Macaronesian shearwater	Puffinus baroli	(A)

== Storks ==
Order: Ciconiiformes Family: Ciconiidae

Storks are large, heavy, long-legged, long-necked wading birds with long stout bills and wide wingspans. They fly with the neck extended.

Common name	Binomial	Status
Black stork	Ciconia nigra	(A)
White stork	Ciconia ciconia	(A)

== Boobies and gannets ==
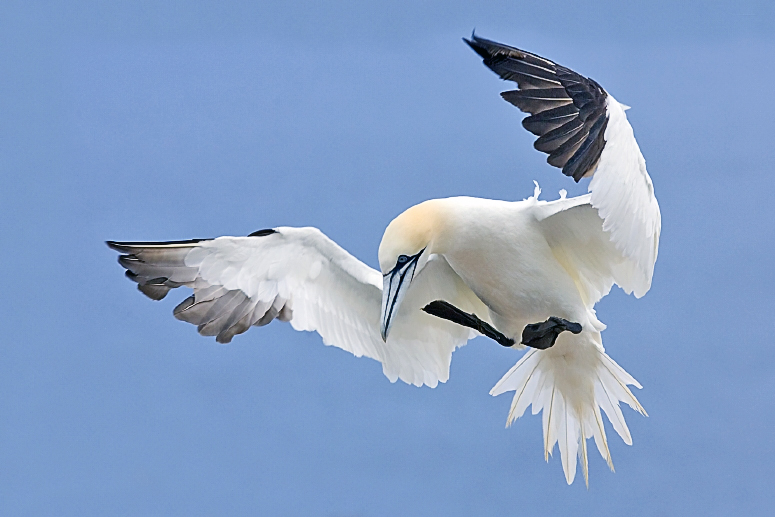
The gannet has a single major Welsh colony at Grassholm island, now with over 30,000 pairs.

Order: Suliformes Family: Pelecanidae

Gannets are large seabirds that plunge-dive for fish and nest in large colonies. They have a torpedo-shaped body, long, narrow, pointed wings and a fairly long tail.

Common name	Binomial	Status
Gannet	Morus bassanus	

== Cormorants and shags ==
Order: Suliformes Family: Phalacrocoracidae

Cormorants are medium to large aquatic birds with mainly dark plumage and areas of coloured skin on the face. The bill is long, thin and sharply hooked for catching fish and aquatic invertebrates. They nest in colonies, usually by the sea.

Common name	Binomial	Status
Cormorant	Phalacrocorax carbo	
Shag	Gulosus aristotelis	

== Ibises and spoonbills ==
Order: Pelecaniformes Family: Threskiornithidae

A family of long-legged, long-necked wading birds. Ibises have long, curved bills. Spoonbills have a flattened bill, wider at the tip.

Common name	Binomial	Status
Glossy ibis	Plegadis falcinellus	(A)
Spoonbill	Platalea leucorodia	

== Herons and bitterns ==
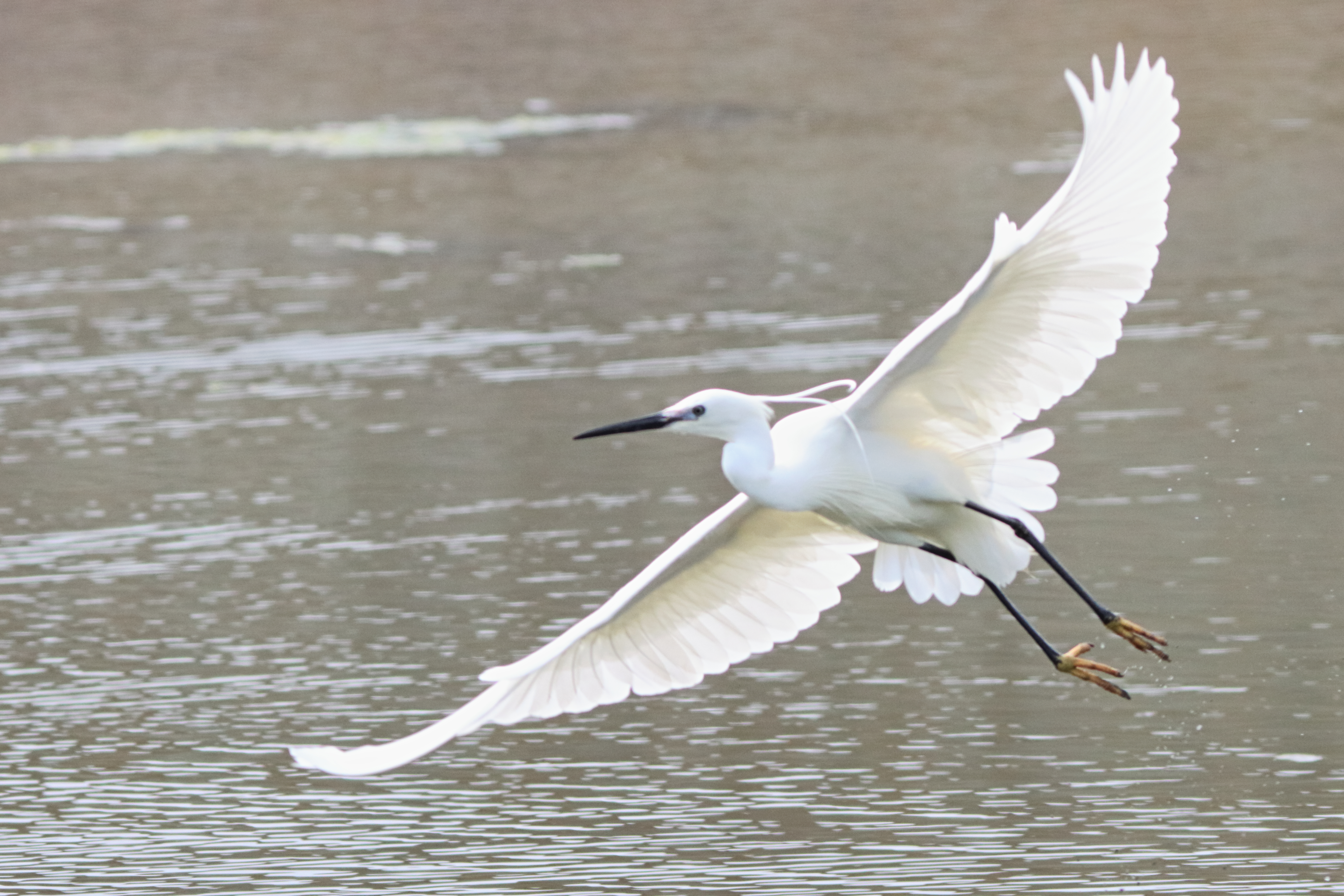
A little egret at Cemlyn Bay. It is a recent colonist that first bred in 2001.

Order: Pelecaniformes Family: Ardeidae

Herons and egrets are medium to large wading birds with long necks and legs. Bitterns tend to be shorter-necked and more secretive. They all fly with their necks retracted. The sharp bill is used to catch fish, amphibians and other animals. Many species nest in colonies, often in trees.

Common name	Binomial	Status
Bittern	Botaurus stellaris	
American bittern	Botaurus lentiginosus	(A)
Little bittern	Ixobrychus minutus	(A)
Night heron	Nycticorax nycticorax	(A)
Green heron	Butorides virescens	(A)
Squacco heron	Ardeola ralloides	(A)
Cattle egret	Bubulcus ibis	
Grey heron	Ardea cinerea	
Purple heron	Ardea purpurea	(A)
Great white egret	Ardea alba	(A)
Little egret	Egretta garzetta	

== Osprey ==
Order: Accipitriformes Family: Pandionidae

A large fish-eating bird of prey belonging to a family of its own. It is mainly brown above and white below with long, angled wings. It is mainly a passage migrant in Wales but has recently begun to breed.

Common name	Binomial	Status
Osprey	Pandion haliaetus	

== Hawks, eagles, and kites ==
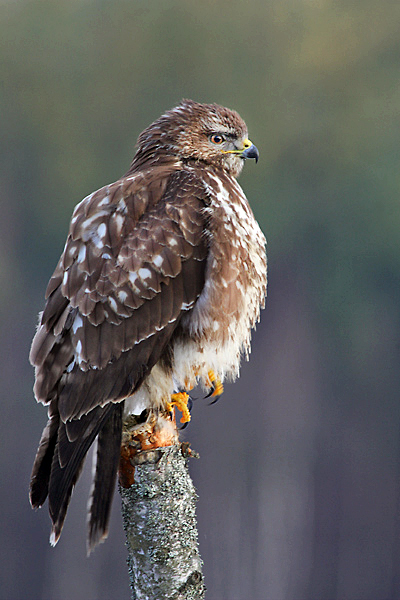
Buzzard, a common bird of prey which reaches high population densities in some areas.

Order: Accipitriformes Family: Accipitridae

A family of birds of prey which includes hawks, buzzards, eagles, kites and harriers. These birds have very large powerful hooked beaks for tearing flesh from their prey, strong legs, powerful talons and keen eyesight.

Common name	Binomial	Status
Honey-buzzard	Pernis apivorus	
Golden eagle	Aquila chrysaetos	(A)
Sparrowhawk	Accipiter nisus	
Goshawk	Accipiter gentilis	
Marsh harrier	Circus aeruginosus	
Hen harrier	Circus cyaneus	
Pallid harrier	Circus macrourus	(A)
Montagu's harrier	Circus pygargus	(A)
Red kite	Milvus milvus	
Black kite	Milvus migrans	(A)
White-tailed eagle	Haliaaetus albicilla	(A)
Rough-legged buzzard	Buteo lagopus	(A)
Buzzard	Buteo buteo	

== Barn owls ==
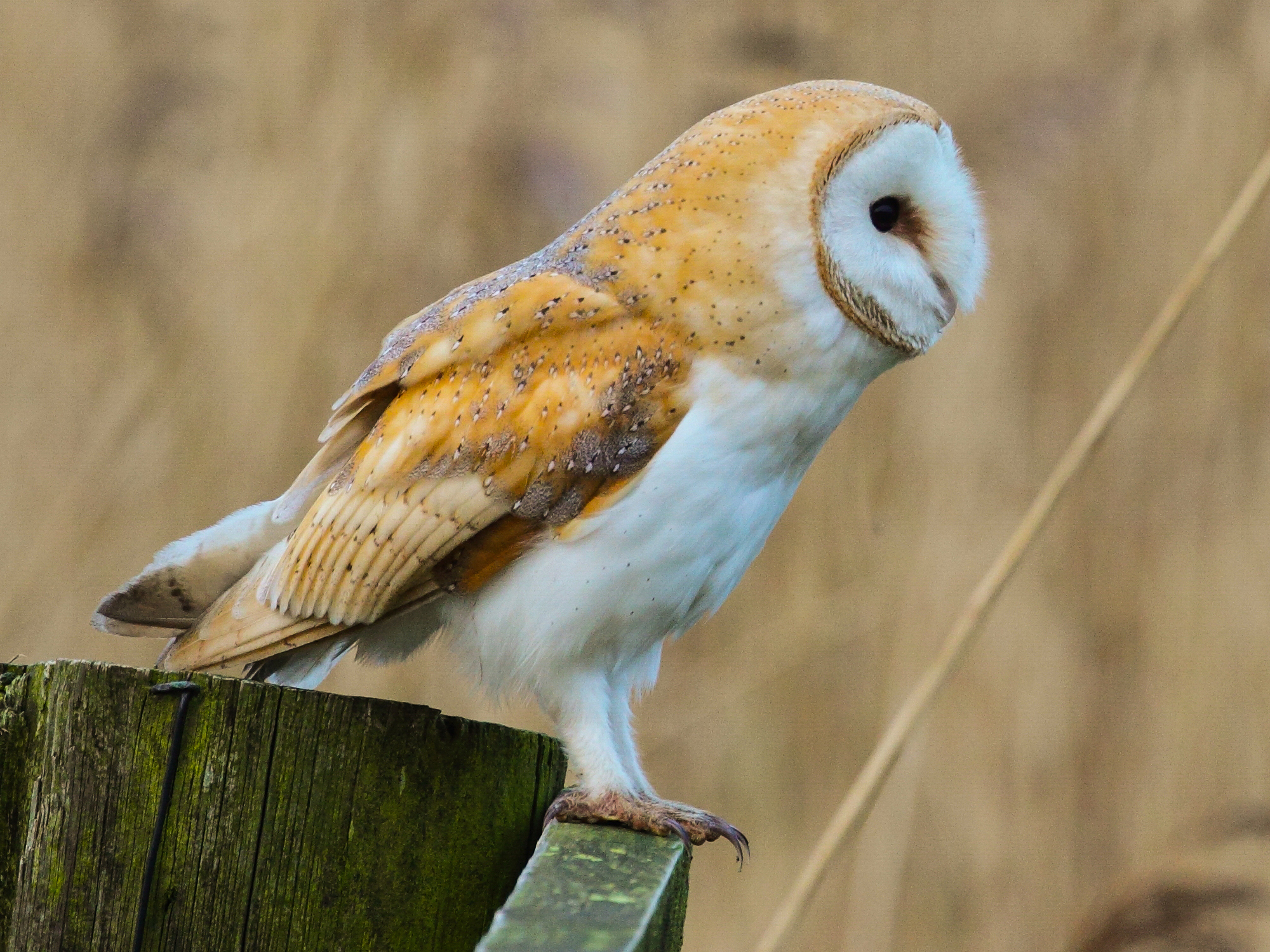
Barn owl, a scarce bird of farmland.

Order: Strigiformes Family: Tytonidae

Barn owls are medium-sized to large owls with large heads and characteristic heart-shaped faces. They have long strong legs with powerful talons.

Common name	Binomial	Status
Barn owl	Tyto alba	

== Owls ==
Order: Strigiformes Family: Strigidae

Typical owls are small to large solitary nocturnal birds of prey. They have large forward-facing eyes and ears, a hawk-like beak and a conspicuous circle of feathers around each eye called a facial disc.

Common name	Binomial	Status
Little owl	Athene noctua	
Scops owl	Otus scops	(A)
Long-eared owl	Asio otus	
Short-eared owl	Asio flammeus	
Snowy owl	Bubo scandiaca	(A)
Tawny owl	Strix aluco	

== Hoopoes ==
Order: Bucerotiformes Family: Upupidae

A distinctive bird in its own family with a long curved bill, a crest, and black-and-white striped wings and tail.

Common name	Binomial	Status
Hoopoe	Upupa epops	

== Rollers ==
Order: Coraciiformes Family: Coraciidae

A small family of colourful, medium-sized, birds with a crow-like shape that feeds mainly on insects.

Common name	Binomial	Status
Roller	Coracias garrulus	(A)

== Kingfishers ==
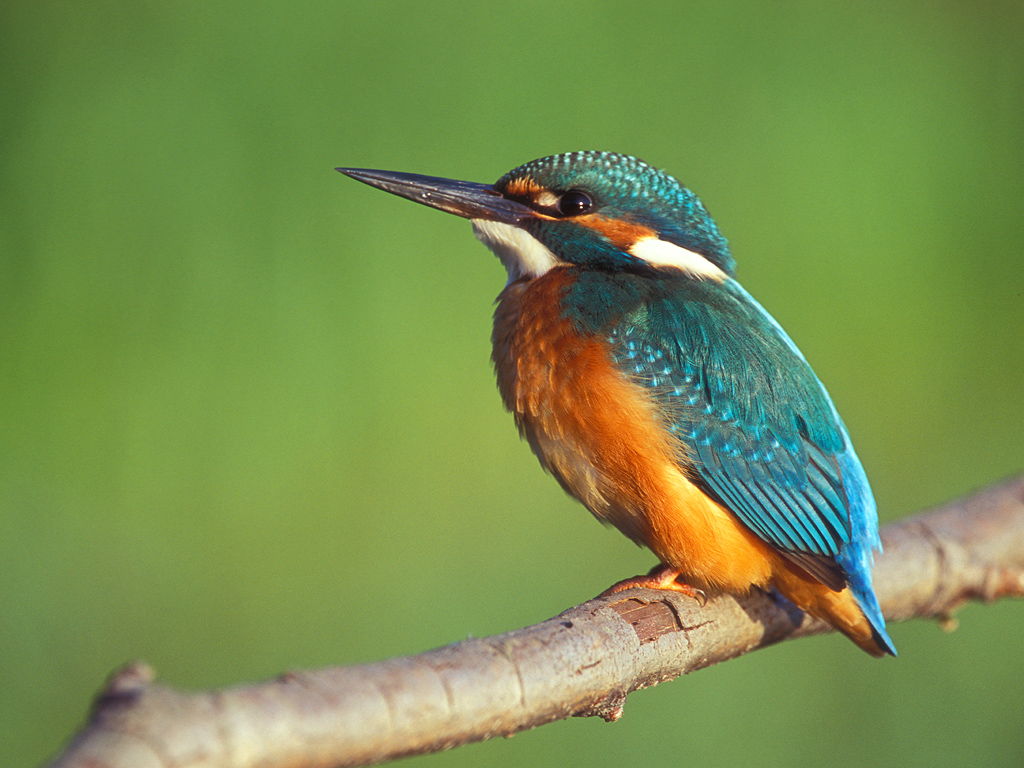
Kingfisher, a colourful inhabitant of lowland waters

Order: Coraciiformes Family: Alcedinidae

Kingfishers are medium-sized birds with large heads, long pointed bills, short legs and stubby tails. There are about 93 species worldwide, 2 in Britain and 1 in Wales.

Common name	Binomial	Status
Kingfisher	Alcedo atthis	

== Bee-eaters ==
Order: Coraciiformes Family: Meropidae

A group of near-passerine birds characterised by richly coloured plumage, slender bodies and usually elongated central tail feathers.

Common name	Binomial	Status
Bee-eater	Merops apiaster	(A)

== Woodpeckers ==
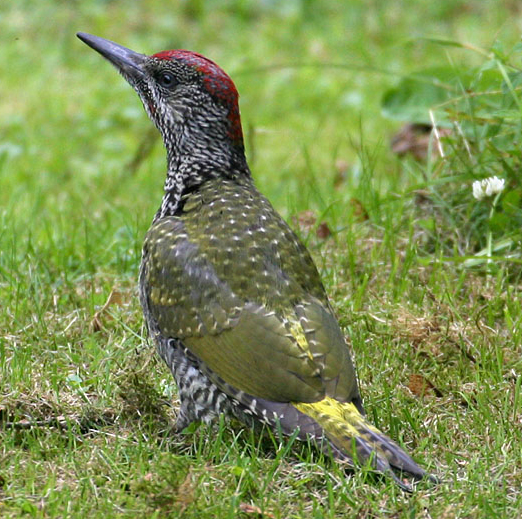
A young green woodpecker, declining in many western areas

Order: Piciformes Family: Picidae

Woodpeckers are small to medium-sized birds with chisel-like beaks, short legs, stiff tails and long tongues used for capturing insects. Many woodpeckers have the habit of tapping noisily on tree trunks with their beaks.

Common name	Binomial	Status
Wryneck	Jynx tranquila	
Lesser spotted woodpecker	Dryobates minor	
Great spotted woodpecker	Dendrocopos major	
Green woodpecker	Picus viridis	

== Falcons and caracaras ==
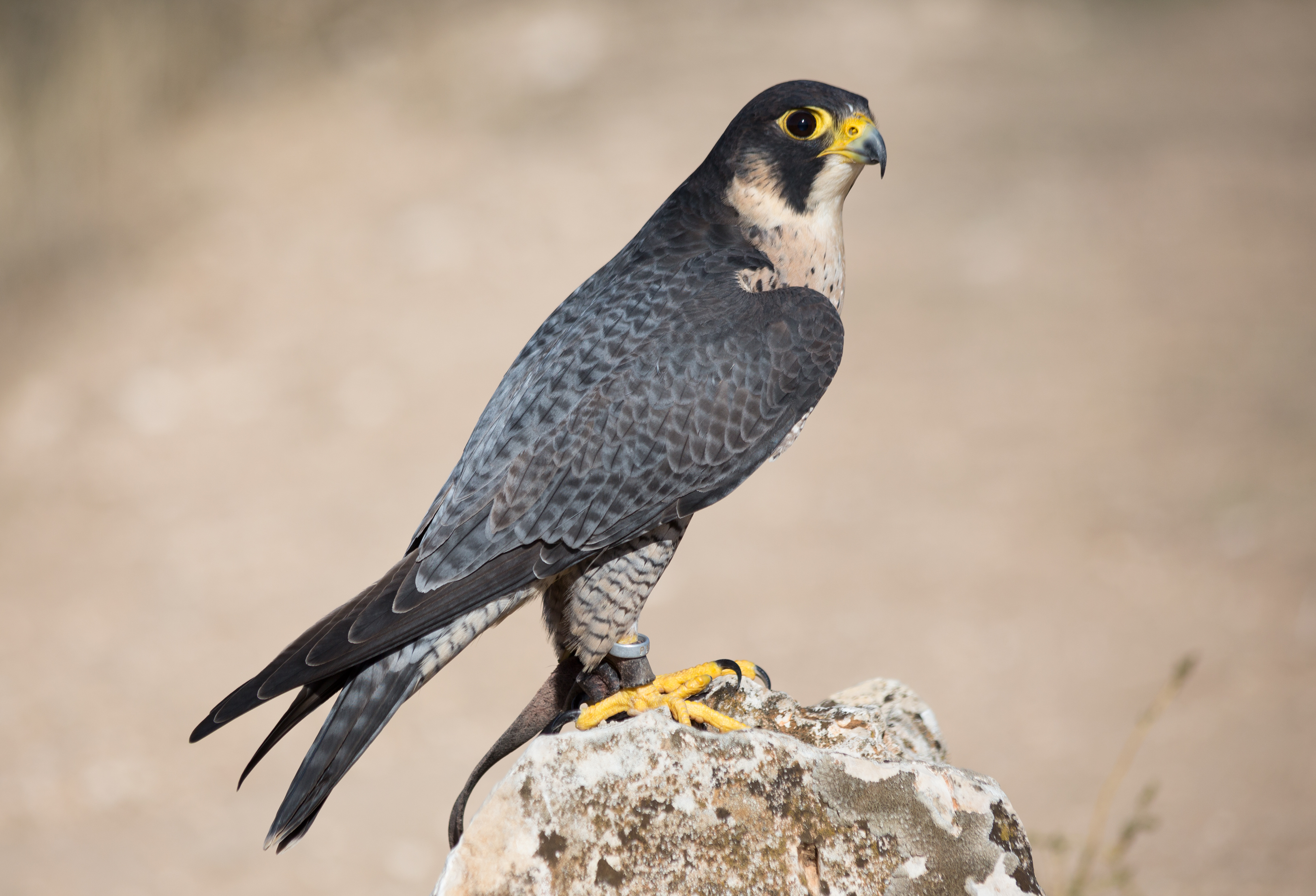
Peregrines from Wales have been used in falconry since Medieval times.

Order: Falconiformes Family: Falconidae

A family of small to medium-sized, diurnal birds of prey with pointed wings. They do not build their own nests and mainly catch prey in the air.

Common name	Binomial	Status
Kestrel	Falco tinnunculus	
Red-footed falcon	Falco vespertinus	(A)
Merlin	Falco columbarius	
Hobby	Falco subbuteo	
Gyr falcon	Falco rusticolus	(A)
Peregrine	Falco peregrinus	

== Shrikes ==
Order: Passeriformes Family: Laniidae

Shrikes are passerine birds known for their habit of catching other birds and small animals and impaling the uneaten portions of their bodies on thorns. A typical shrike's beak is hooked, like a bird of prey.

Common name	Binomial	Status
Red-backed shrike	Lanius collurio	(A)
Turkestan shrike	Lanius phoenicuroides	
Lesser grey shrike	Lanius minor	(A)
Great grey shrike	Lanius excubitor	
Woodchat shrike	Lanius senator	(A)

== Vireos ==
Order: Passeriformes Family: Vireonidae

The vireos are a group of small to medium-sized passerine birds restricted to the New World.

Common name	Binomial	Status
Red-eyed vireo	Vireo olivaceus	(A)

== Old World orioles ==
Order: Passeriformes Family: Oriolidae

Orioles are colourful, medium-sized passerine birds with far-carrying, fluting songs.

Common name	Binomial	Status
Golden oriole	Oriolus oriolus	

== Crows, jays, and magpies ==
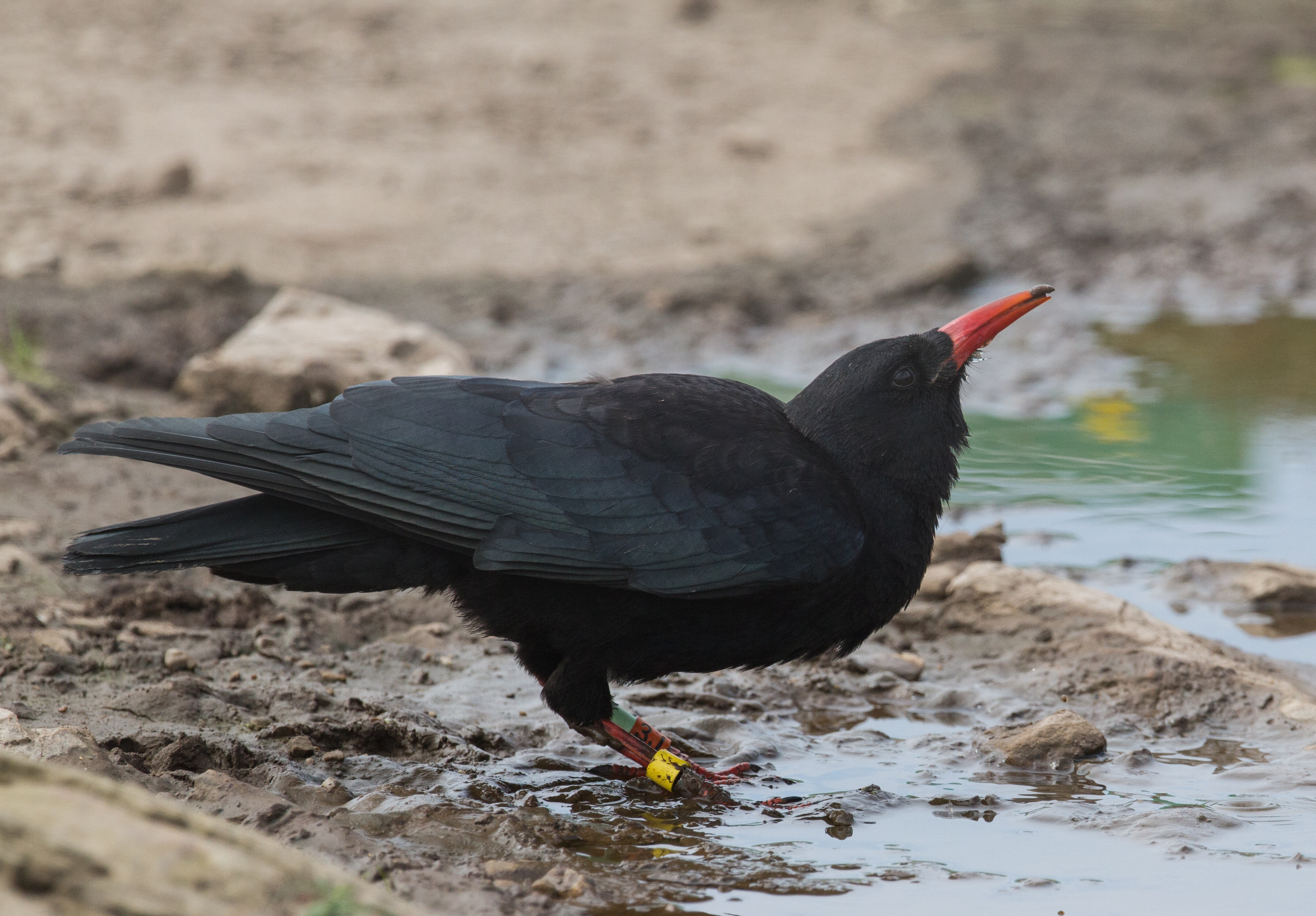
Chough, Wales has some of the most important populations of this species in Britain.

Order: Passeriformes Family: Corvidae

The crows and their relatives are fairly large birds with strong bills and are usually intelligent and adaptable.

Common name	Binomial	Status
Jay	Garrulus glandarius	
Magpie	Pica pica	
Nutcracker	Nucifraga caryocatactes	(A)
Chough	Pyrrhocorax pyrrhocorax	
Jackdaw	Corvus monedula	
Rook	Corvus frugilegus	
Carrion crow	Corvus corone	
Hooded crow	Corvus cornix	
Raven	Corvus corax	

== Waxwings ==
Order: Passeriformes Family: Bombycillidae

The waxwings are a group of passerine birds characterised by soft, silky plumage and unique red tips to some of the wing feathers.

Common name	Binomial	Status
Waxwing	Bombycilla garrulus	
Cedar waxwing	Bombycilla cedrorum	(A)

== Tits, chickadees, and titmice ==
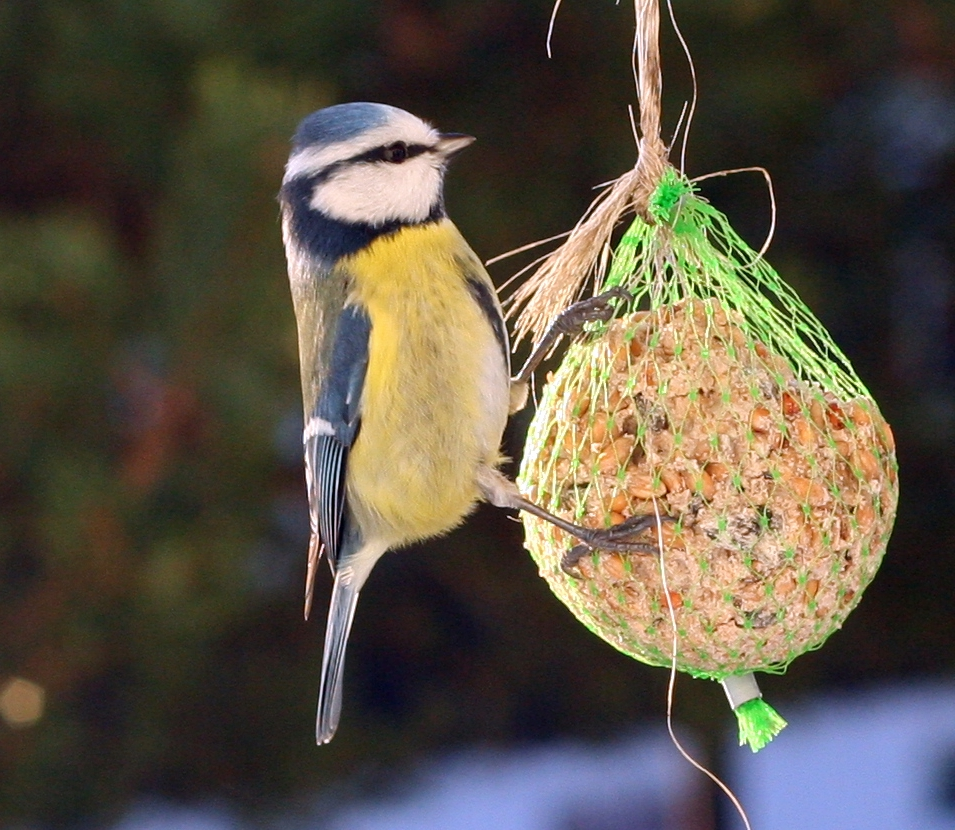
Blue tit, a common woodland bird which easily adapts to parks and gardens

Order: Passeriformes Family: Paridae

Tits are mainly small, stocky, woodland species with short stout bills. They are adaptable birds, with a mixed diet including seeds and insects.

Common name	Binomial	Status
Coal tit	Periparus ater	
Marsh tit	Poecile palustris	
Willow tit	Poecile montana	
Blue tit	Cyanistes caeruleus	
Great tit	Parus major	

== Penduline tits ==
Order: Passeriformes Family: Remizidae

Small birds with finely pointed bills that build purse-like nests hanging from a branch.

Common name	Binomial	Status
Penduline tit	Remiz pendulinus	(A)

== Bearded tit ==
Order: Passeriformes Family: Panuridae

This species, the only one in its family, is found in reed beds throughout temperate Europe and Asia.

Common name	Binomial	Status
Bearded tit	Panurus biarmicus	(A)

== Larks ==
Order: Passeriformes Family: Alaudidae

Larks are small terrestrial birds with often extravagant songs and display flights. Most larks are fairly dull in appearance. Their food is insects and seeds.

Common name	Binomial	Status
Woodlark	Lullula arborea	(A)
Skylark	Alauda arvensis	
Crested lark	Galerida cristata	(A)
Shore lark	Eremophila alpestris	(A)
Short-toed lark	Calandrella brachydactyla	(A)
Black lark	Melanocorypha yeltoniensis	(A)

== Swallows ==
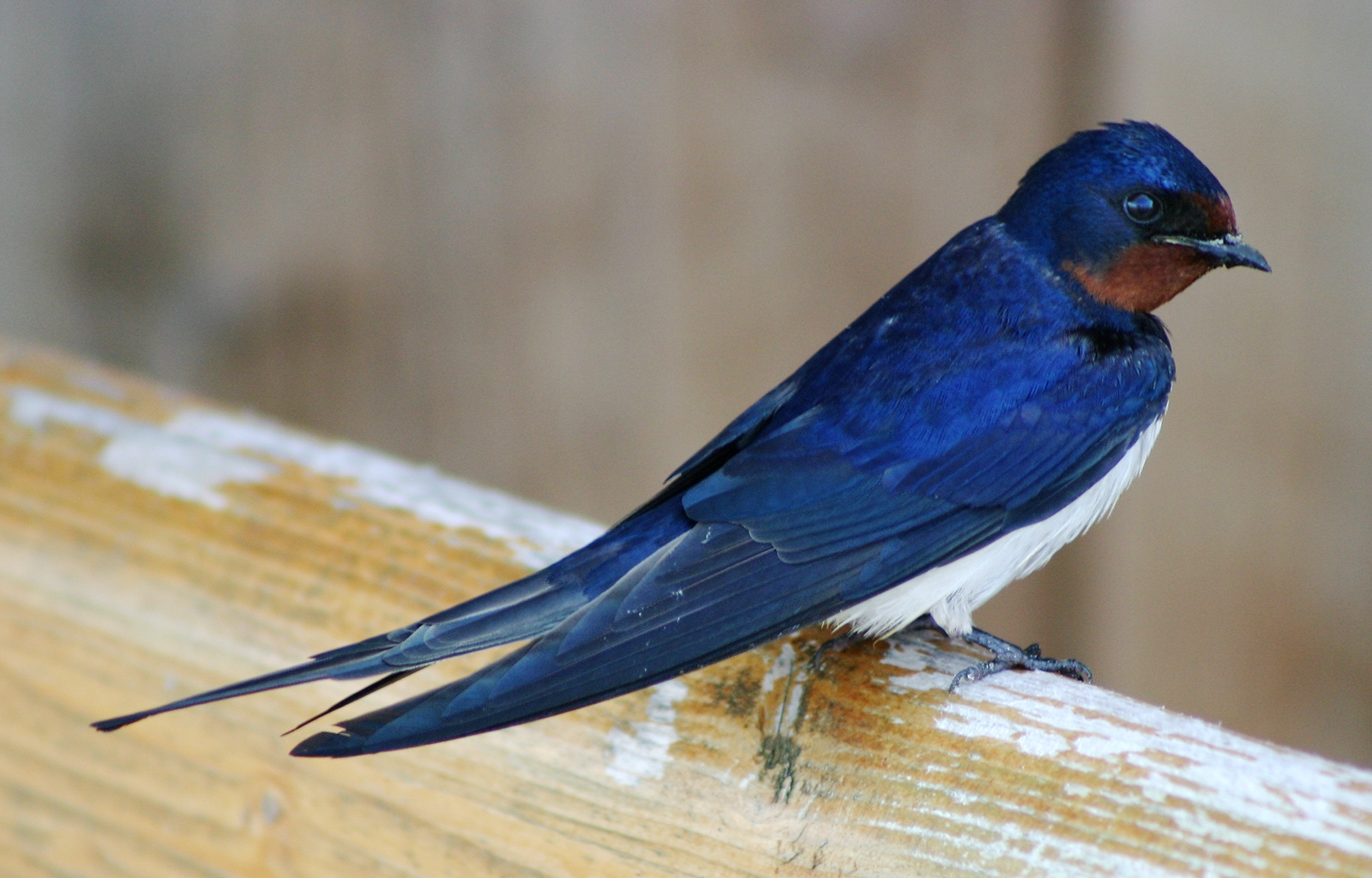
Swallow, a very widespread summer visitor breeding in every 10km square in Wales.

Order: Passeriformes Family: Hirundinidae

The family Hirundinidae is adapted to aerial feeding. They have a slender streamlined body, long pointed wings and a short bill with a wide gape.

Common name	Binomial	Status
Sand martin	Riparia riparia	
Crag martin	Ptyonoprogne rupestris	(A)
Swallow	Hirundo rustica	
House martin	Delichon urbicum	
Red-rumped swallow	Cecropis daurica	(A)

== Bush warblers and allies ==
Order: Passeriformes Family: Scotocercidae

The members of this family are found throughout Africa, Asia, and Polynesia. Their taxonomy is in flux, and some authorities place some genera in other families.

Common name	Binomial	Status
Cetti's warbler	Cettia cetti	

== Long-tailed tits ==
Order: Passeriformes Family: Aegithalidae

Small, long-tailed birds that typically live in flocks for much of the year.

Common name	Binomial	Status
Long-tailed tit	Aegithalos caudatus	

== Leaf warblers ==
Order: Passeriformes Family: Phylloscopidae

Leaf warblers are a family of small insectivorous birds found mostly in Eurasia and ranging into Wallacea and Africa. The species are of various sizes, often green-plumaged above and yellow below, or more subdued with greyish-green to greyish-brown colours.

Common name	Binomial	Status
Wood warbler	Phylloscopus sibalatrix	
Western Bonelli's warbler	Phylloscopus bonelli	(A)
Hume's warbler	Phylloscopus humei	(A)
Yellow-browed warbler	Phylloscopus inornatus	
Pallas's warbler	Phylloscopus proregulus	(A)
Radde's warbler	Phylloscopus schwarzi	(A)
Dusky warbler	Phylloscopus fuscatus	(A)
Willow warbler	Phylloscopus trochilus	
Chiffchaff	Phylloscopus collybita	(A)
Iberian chiffchaff	Phylloscopus ibericus	(A)
Greenish warbler	Phylloscopus trochiloides	(A)
Arctic warbler	Phylloscopus borealis	(A)

== Reed warblers and allies ==
Order: Passeriformes Family: Acrocephalidae

The members of this family are usually rather large for "warblers". Most are rather plain olivaceous brown above with much yellow to beige below. They are usually found in open woodland, reedbeds, or tall grass. The family occurs mostly in southern to western Eurasia and surroundings, but it also ranges far into the Pacific, with some species in Africa.

Common name	Binomial	Status
Great reed warbler	Acrocephalus arundinaceus	(A)
Aquatic warbler	Acrocephalus paludicola	(A)
Sedge warbler	Acrocephalus schoenobaenus	
Paddyfield warbler	Acrocephalus agricola	(A)
Blyth's reed warbler	Acrocephalus dumetorum	(A)
Reed warbler	Acrocephalus scirpaceus	
Marsh warbler	Acrocephalus palustris	(A)
Booted warbler	Iduna caligata	(A)
Melodious warbler	Hippolais polyglotta	(A)
Icterine warbler	Hippolais icterina	(A)

== Grassbirds and allies ==
Order: Passeriformes Family: Locustellidae

Locustellidae are a family of small insectivorous songbirds found mainly in Eurasia, Africa, and the Australian region. They are smallish birds with tails that are usually long and pointed, and tend to be drab brownish or buffy all over.

Common name	Binomial	Status
Lanceolated warbler	Locustella lanceolata	(A)
River warbler	Locustella fluviatilis	(A)
Savi's warbler	Locustella luscinioides	(A)
Grasshopper warbler	Locustella naevia	

== Sylviid warblers, parrotbills, and allies ==
Order: Passeriformes Family: Sylviidae

A group of small, insectivorous passerine birds. Most are of generally undistinguished appearance, but many have distinctive songs.

Common name	Binomial	Status
Blackcap	Sylvia atricapilla	
Garden warbler	Sylvia borin	
Barred warbler	Curruca nisoria	(A)
Lesser whitethroat	Curruca curruca	
Western Orphean warbler	Curruca hortensis	(A)
Rüppell's warbler	Curruca ruppeli	(A)
Sardinian warbler	Curruca melanocephala	(A)
Western subalpine warbler	Curruca iberiae	(A)
Eastern subalpine warbler	Curruca cantillans	(A)
whitethroat	Curruca communis	
Marmora's warbler	Curruca sarda	(A)
Dartford warbler	Curruca undata	

== Kinglets ==
Order: Passeriformes Family: Regulidae

The kinglets, also called crests, are a small group of birds often included in the Old World warblers, but frequently given family status because they also resemble the titmice.

Common name	Binomial	Status
Common firecrest	Regulus ignicapilla	
Goldcrest	Regulus regulus	

== Wrens ==
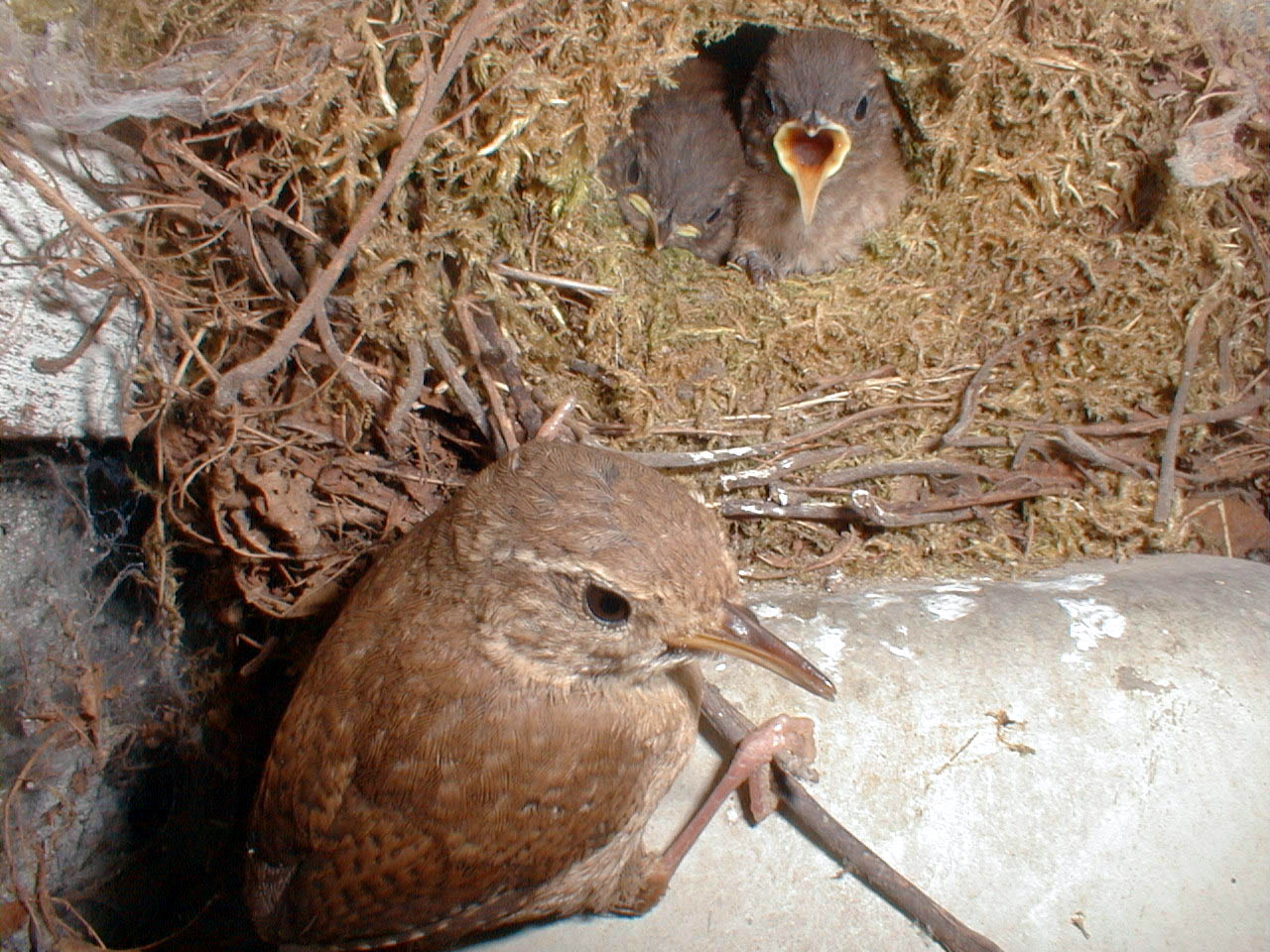
A wren at the nest. It is one of Wales' commonest birds, occurring in a wide variety of habitats.

Order: Passeriformes Family: Troglodytidae

Wrens are small and inconspicuous birds, except for their loud songs. They have short wings and thin down-turned bills.

Common name	Binomial	Status
Wren	Troglodytes troglodytes	

== Nuthatches ==
Order: Passeriformes Family: Sittidae

Nuthatches are small woodland birds with the unusual ability to climb down trees head-first, unlike other birds which can only go upwards.

Common name	Binomial	Status
Nuthatch	Sitta europaea	

== Treecreepers ==
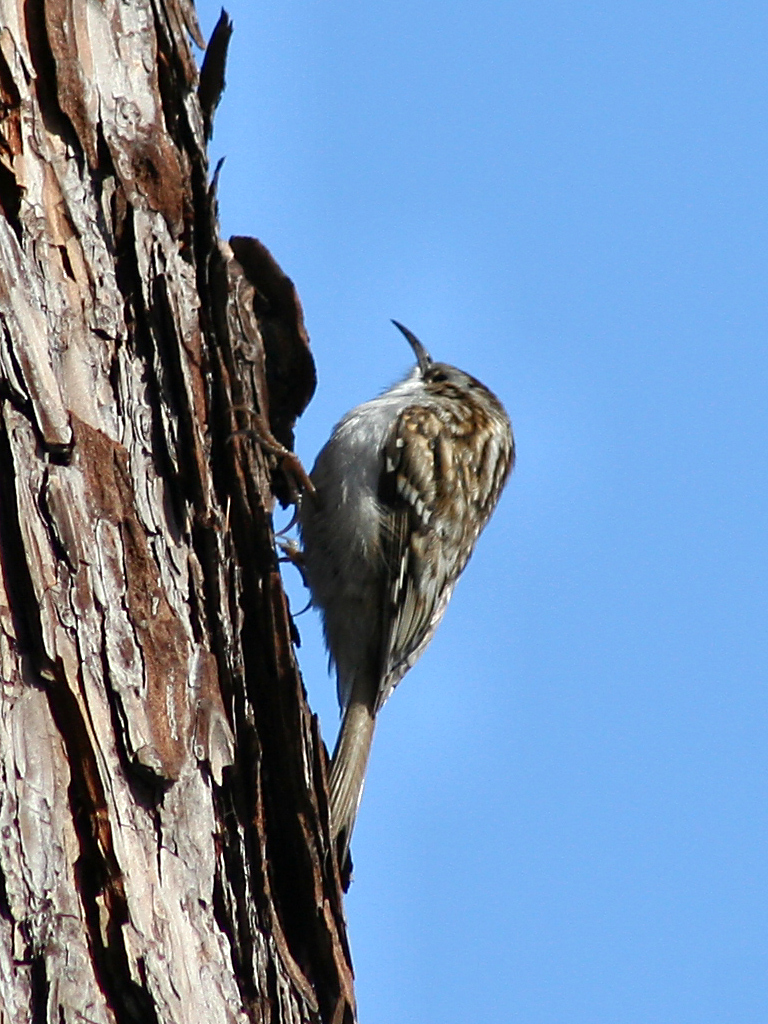
Treecreeper, a common but elusive bird of woodlands

Order: Passeriformes Family: Certhiidae

Treecreepers are small woodland birds, brown above and white below. They have thin, pointed, down-curved bills, which they use to extricate insects from bark.

Common name	Binomial	Status
Treecreeper	Certhia familiaris	

== Mockingbirds and thrashers ==
Order: Passeriformes Family: Mimidae

Medium-sized passerine birds with long tails. Some are notable for their ability to mimic sounds such as other birds' songs.

Common name	Binomial	Status
Grey catbird	Dumetella carolinensis	(A)

== Starlings ==
Order: Passeriformes Family: Sturnidae

Starlings are small to medium-sized passerine birds with strong feet. Their flight is strong and direct and most are very gregarious.

Common name	Binomial	Status
Rose-coloured starling	Pastor roseus	(A)
Starling	Sturnus vulgaris	

== Thrushes and allies ==
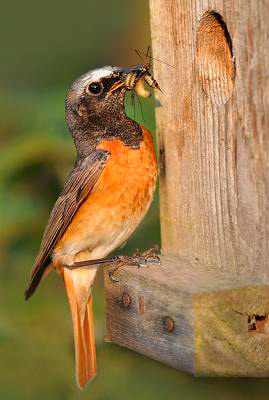
Redstart, a common summer migrant in upland woods and scrub

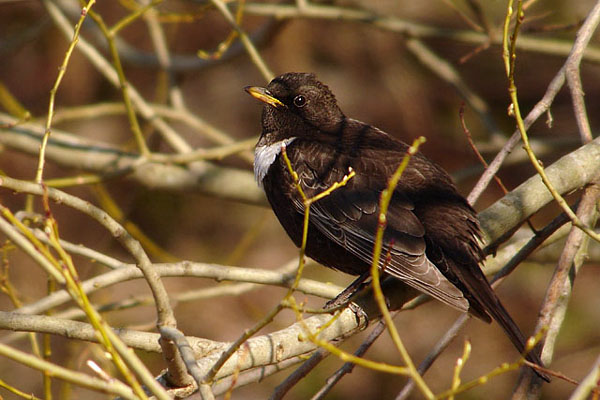
Ring ouzel, a scarce breeder in rocky upland areas

Order: Passeriformes Family: Turdidae

The thrushes and chats are plump, soft-plumaged, small to medium-sized insectivores or sometimes omnivores, often feeding on the ground. Many have attractive songs.

Common name	Binomial	Status
Swainson's thrush	Catharus ustulatus	(A)
Grey-cheeked thrush	Catharus minimus	(A)
Song thrush	Turdus philomelos	
Mistle thrush	Turdus viscivorus	(A)
Redwing	Turdus iliacus	
Blackbird	Turdus merula	
Eyebrowed thrush	Turdus obscurus	(A)
Fieldfare	Turdus pilaris	
Ring ouzel	Turdus torquatus	
Black-throated thrush	Turdus atrogularis	
Red-throated thrush	Turdus ruficollis	(A)
Dusky thrush	Turdus eunomus	(A)
American robin	Turdus viscivorus	(A)

== Old World flycatchers ==
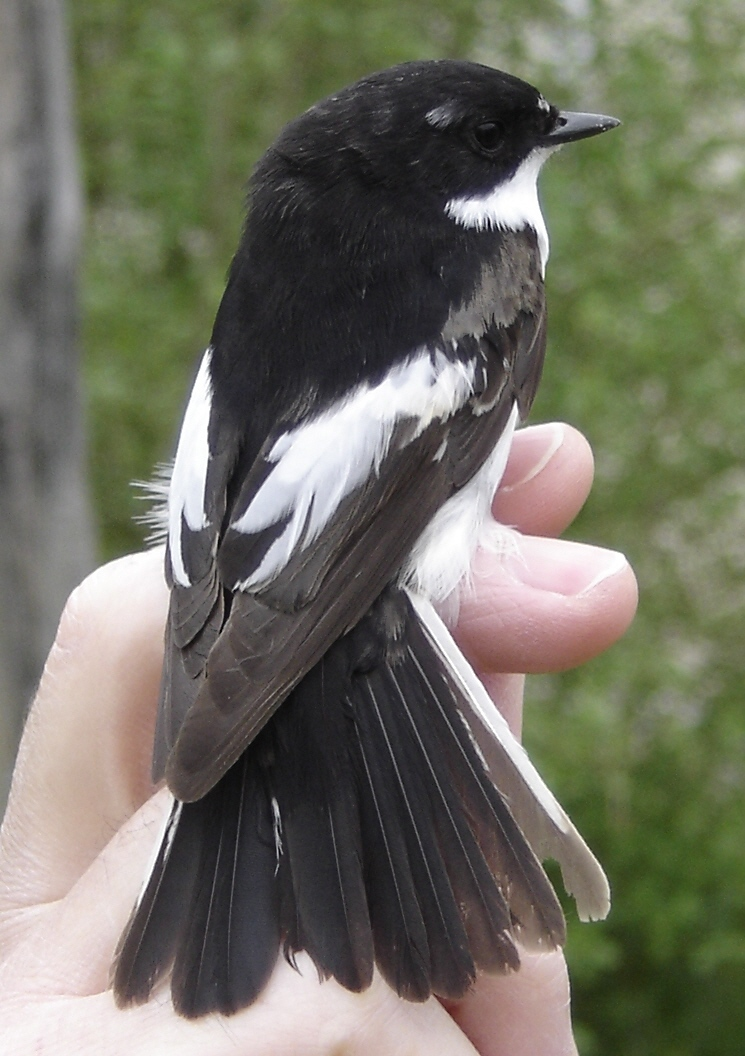
Pied flycatcher, a characteristic bird of sessile oak woods

Order: Passeriformes Family: Muscicapidae

The flycatchers are small birds that fly out from a perch to catch insects in the air.

Common name	Binomial	Status
Spotted flycatcher	Muscicapa striata	
Robin	Erithacus rubecula	
Bluethroat	Luscinia svecica	(A)
Thrush nightingale	Luscinia luscinia	(A)
Nightingale	Luscinia megarhynchos	(A)
White-throated robin	Irania gutturalis	(A)
Red-flanked bluetail	Tarsiger cyanurus	(A)
Red-breasted flycatcher	Ficedula parva	(A)
Pied flycatcher	Ficedula hypoleuca	
Collared flycatcher	Ficedula albicollis	(A)
Black redstart	Phoenicurus ochruros	
Redstart	Phoenicurus phoenicurus	
Moussier's redstart	Phoenicurus moussieri	(A)
Rock thrush	Monticola saxatilis	(A)
Blue rock thrush	Monticola solitarius	(A)
Whinchat	Saxicola rubetra	
Stonechat	Saxicola torquata	
Wheatear	Oenanthe oenanthe	
Isabelline wheatear	Oenanthe isabellina	(A)
Desert wheatear	Oenanthe deserti	(A)
Western black-eared wheatear	Oenanthe hispanica	(A)
Pied wheatear	Oenanthe pleschanka	(A)

== Dippers ==
Order: Passeriformes Family: Cinclidae

Dippers are a group of perching birds whose habitat includes aquatic environments in the Americas, Europe and Asia. They are named for their bobbing or dipping movements.

Common name	Binomial	Status
Dipper	Cinclus cinclus	

== Old World sparrows ==
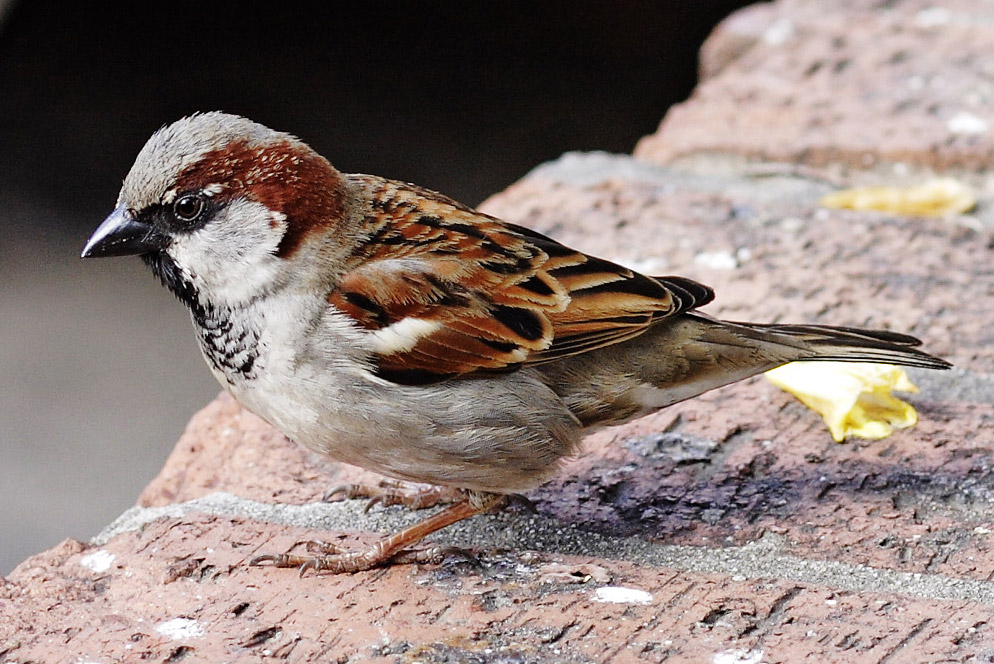
House sparrow, strongly associated with human habitation

Order: Passeriformes Family: Passeridae

Sparrows tend to be small, plump, brownish or greyish birds with short tails and short, powerful beaks. They are seed-eaters and they also consume small insects.

Common name	Binomial	Status
Tree sparrow	Passer montanus	
Spanish sparrow	Passer hispaniolensis	(A)
House sparrow	Passer domesticus	

== Accentors ==
Order: Passeriformes Family: Prunellidae

A small family of drab, unobtrusive, insectivorous birds with thin, pointed bills.

Common name	Binomial	Status
Alpine accentor	Prunella collaris	(A)
Dunnock	Prunella modularis	

== Wagtails and pipits ==
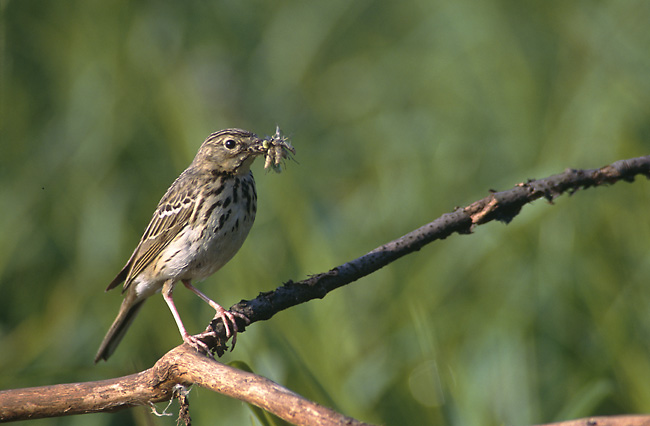
Tree pipit, widely distributed across the country in summer.

Order: Passeriformes Family: Motacillidae

Motacillidae is a family of small passerine birds with medium to long tails. They are slender, ground-feeding insectivores of open country.

Common name	Binomial	Status
Western yellow wagtail	Motacilla flava	(A)
Eastern yellow wagtail	Motacilla tschutschensis	(A)
Citrine wagtail	Motacilla citreola	(A)
Grey wagtail	Motacilla cinerea	
White wagtail	Motacilla alba	
Richard's pipit	Anthus richardi	
Blyth's pipit	Anthus godlewskii	(A)
Tawny pipit	Anthus campestris	(A)
Meadow pipit	Anthus pratensis	
Tree pipit	Anthus trivialis	
Olive-backed pipit	Anthus hodgsoni	(A)
Pechora pipit	Anthus gustavi	(A)
Red-throated pipit	Anthus cervinus	(A)
Buff-bellied pipit	Anthus rubescens	(A)
Water pipit	Anthus spinoletta	
Rock pipit	Anthus petrosus	

== Finches, euphonias, and allies ==
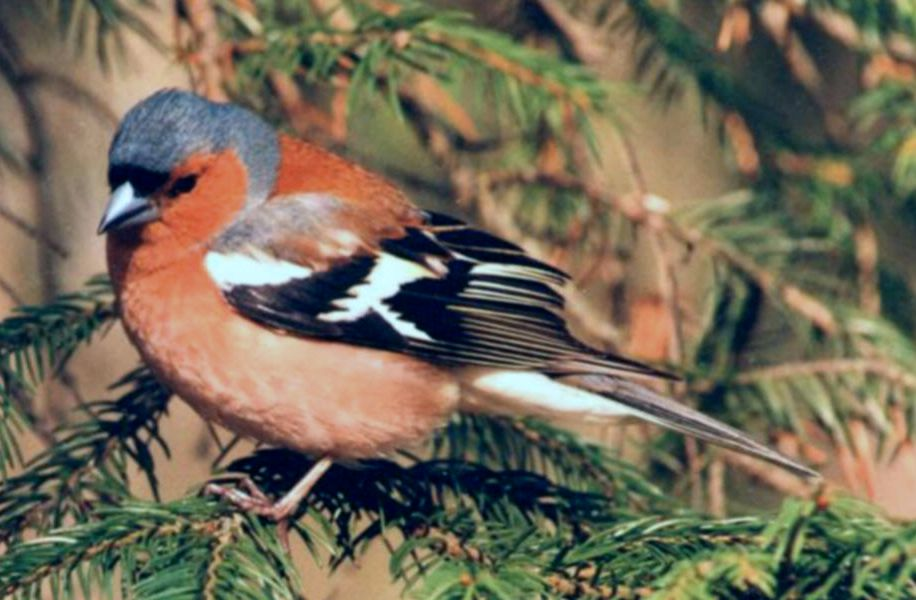
Chaffinch, one of the commonest and most widespread species in Wales

Order: Passeriformes Family: Fringillidae

Seed-eating passerine birds that are small to moderately large and have a strong beak, usually conical and in some species very large.

Common name	Binomial	Status
Chaffinch	Fringilla coelebs	
Brambling	Fringilla montifringilla	
Hawfinch	Coccothraustes coccothraustes	
Bullfinch	Pyrrhula pyrrhula	
Common rosefinch	Carpodacus erythrinus	(A)
Greenfinch	Chloris chloris	
Twite	Linaria flavirostris	
Linnet	Linaria cannabina	
Common redpoll	Acanthis flammea	(A)
Lesser redpoll	Acanthis cabaret	
Arctic redpoll	Acanthis hornemanni	(A)
Common crossbill	Loxia curvirostra	
Two-barred crossbill	Loxia leucoptera	(A)
Goldfinch	Carduelis carduelis	
Serin	Serinus serinus	(A)
Siskin	Spinus spinus	

== Longspurs and arctic buntings ==
Order: Passeriformes Family: Calcariidae

The Calcariidae are a family of birds that had been traditionally grouped with the New World sparrows, but differ in a number of respects and are usually found in open grassy areas.

Common name	Binomial	Status
Lapland bunting	Calcarius lapponicus	
Snow bunting	Plectrophenax nivalis	

== Old World buntings ==
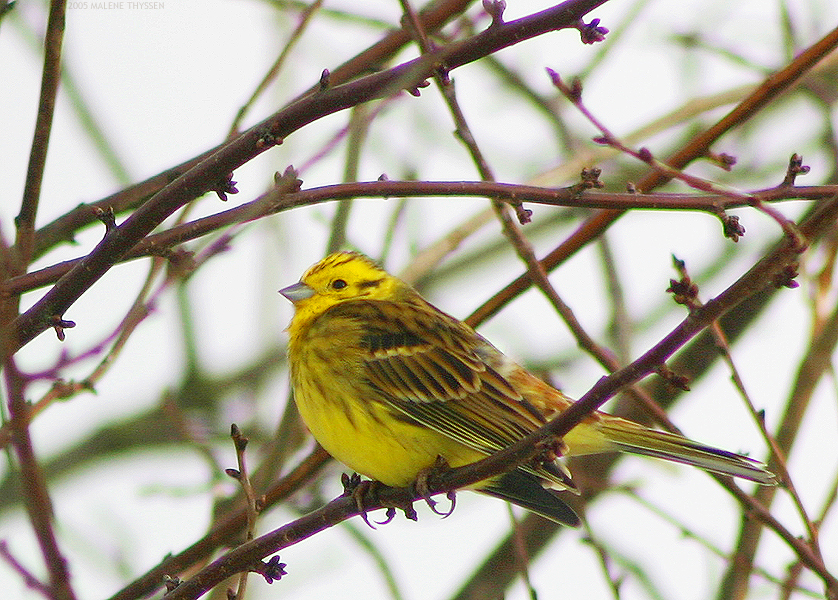
Yellowhammer, a declining species but still the commonest bunting in Wales

Order: Passeriformes Family: Emberizidae

The Emberizidae are a large family of seed-eating passerine birds with a distinctively shaped bill.

Common name	Binomial	Status
Corn bunting	Emberiza calandra	(A)
Yellowhammer	Emberiza citrinella	
Pine bunting	Emberiza leucocephalos	(A)
Rock bunting	Emberiza cia	(A)
Ortolan bunting	Emberiza hortulana	(A)
Cretzschmar's bunting	Emberiza caesia	(A)
Cirl bunting	Emberiza cirlus	(A)
Little bunting	Emberiza pusilla	(A)
Rustic bunting	Emberiza rustica	(A)
Yellow-breasted bunting	Emberiza aureola	(A)
Black-headed bunting	Emberiza melanocephala	(A)
Reed bunting	Emberiza schoeniclus	

== New World sparrows ==
Order: Passeriformes Family: Passerellidae

Until 2017, these species were considered part of the family Emberizidae. Most of the species are known as sparrows, but these birds are not closely related to the Old World sparrows which are in the family Passeridae. Many of these have distinctive head patterns.

Common name	Binomial	Status
Dark-eyed junco	Junco hyemalis	(A)
White-throated sparrow	Zonotrichia albicollis	(A)
Song sparrow	Melospiza melodia	(A)

== Troupials and allies ==
Order: Passeriformes Family: Icteridae

A group of small to medium-sized, often colourful passerine birds restricted to the New World.

Common name	Binomial	Status
Bobolink	Dolichonyx oryzivorus	(A)
Baltimore oriole	Icterus galbula	(A)
Brown-headed cowbird	Molothrus ater	(A)

== New World warblers ==
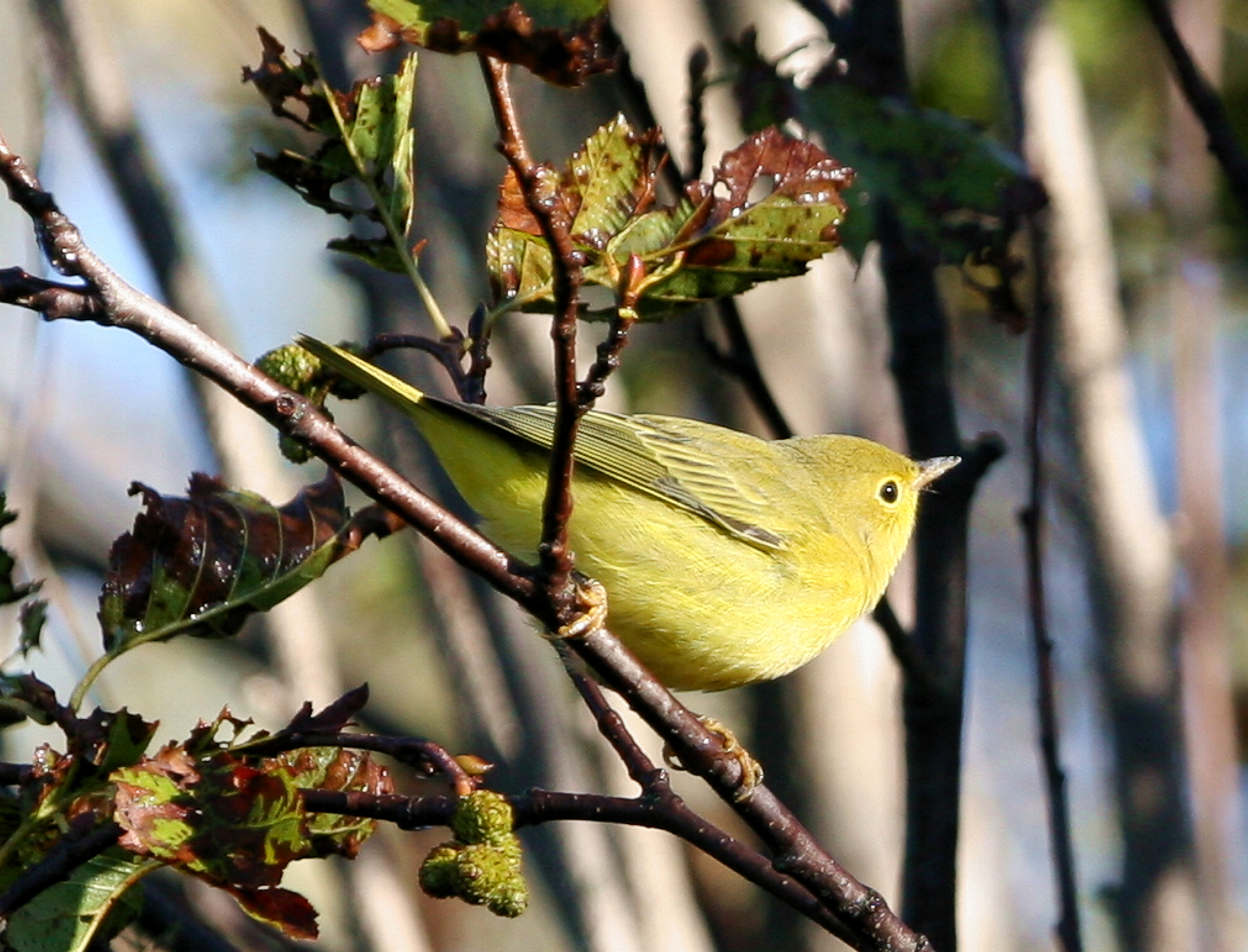
Yellow warbler, one on Bardsey Island in 1964 was the first European record of this North American species.

Order: Passeriformes Family: Panuridae

A group of small, often colourful passerine birds restricted to the New World. Most are arboreal and insectivorous.

Common name	Binomial	Status
Black-and-white warbler	Mniotilta varia	(A)
Common yellowthroat	Geothlypas trichas	(A)
Blackburnian warbler	Setophaga fusca	(A)
Yellow warbler	Setophaga petechia	(A)
Blackpoll warbler	Setophaga striata	(A)
Yellow-rumped warbler	Setophaga coronata	(A)

== Cardinals and allies ==
Order: Passeriformes Family: Cardinalidae

The cardinals are a family of robust, seed-eating birds with strong bills. They are typically associated with open woodland. The sexes usually have distinct plumages.

Common name	Binomial	Status
Summer tanager	Piranga rubra	(A)
Rose-breasted grosbeak	Pheucticus ludovicianus	(A)
Indigo bunting	Passerina cyanea	(A)

== See also ==
- List of birds of Great Britain
- British avifauna
- Lists of birds by region
