= British avifauna =

The British avifauna is the birds that have occurred in Great Britain. This article is a general discussion of the topic. A full species list can be found at List of birds of Great Britain.

In general, the avifauna of Britain is similar to that of Europe, consisting largely of Palaearctic species. As an island, it has fewer breeding species than continental Europe, with some species, like crested lark, breeding as close as northern France, yet unable to colonise Britain.

The mild winters mean that many species that cannot cope with harsher conditions can winter in Britain, and also that there is a large influx of wintering birds from the continent or beyond.

There are about 250 species regularly recorded in Great Britain, and another 350 that occur with varying degrees of rarity.

== Resident species ==
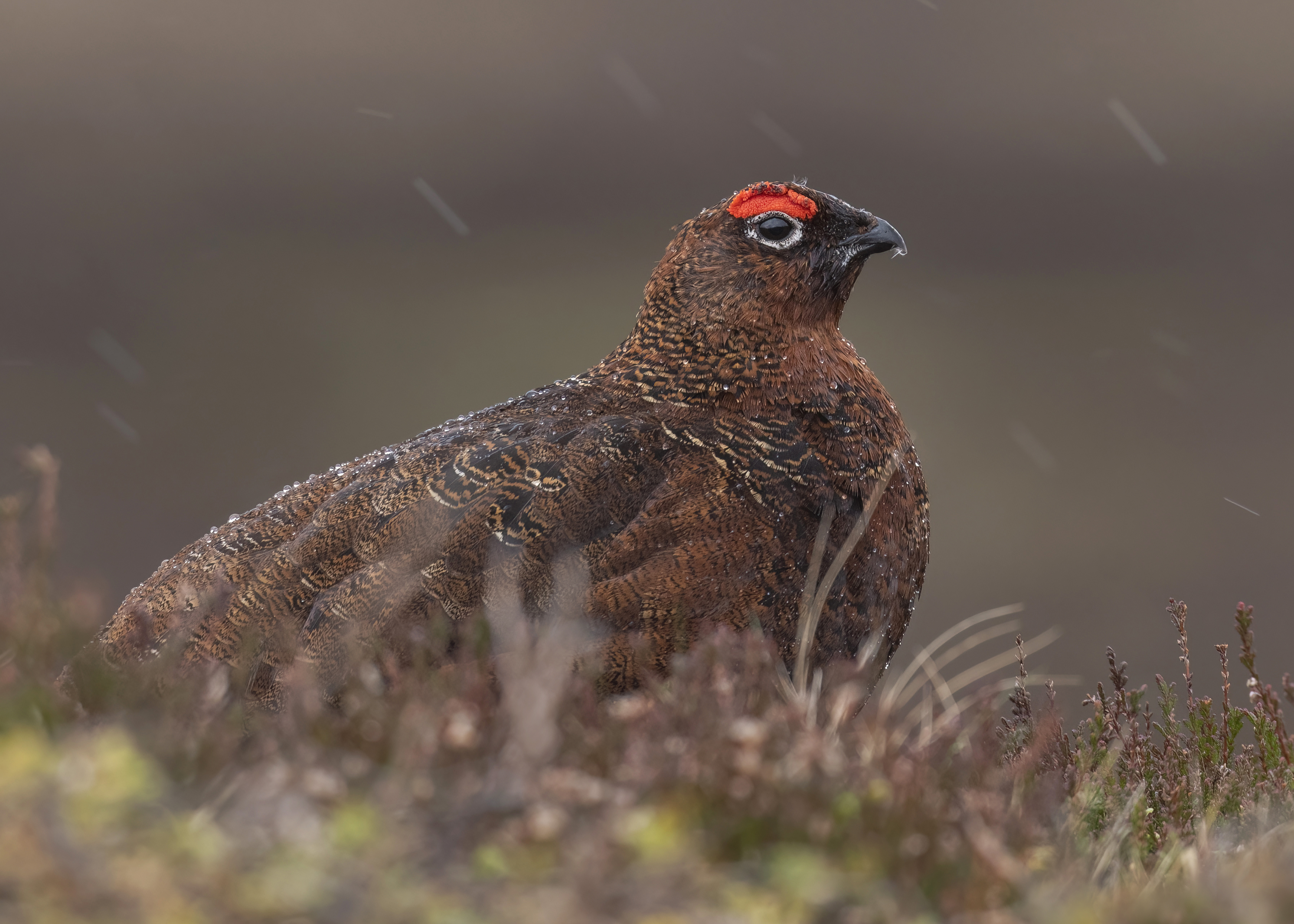
Red grouse

About 120 species occur in Great Britain all year round. Some of these are permanent populations of sedentary non-migrants such as tawny owl or red grouse, whereas others have their numbers augmented by winter visitors from the continent (for example common starling), or depleted by winter hard-weather movements to Ireland or southern Europe (for example European goldfinch).

Several species, particularly waders such as ringed plover and dunlin, both breed and winter in Britain, whereas these areas are separate for most other populations of those birds.

The black-tailed godwit is an interesting case. Although it is present all year, the breeding population actually migrates south, and is replaced by wintering birds of the Icelandic race.

== Visiting species ==
=== Summer visitors ===
About 60 species are mainly summer visitors which breed in Britain but winter further south, mainly in Africa. A large number of these are insectivores such as warblers, flycatchers and common cuckoo, as would be expected from the scarcity of insects in British winters.

Several seabirds move out to sea after breeding, and terns and some auks are absent during the winter months.

In 2007, 16 million birds flew from Africa to Britain. Swifts have declined 40% between 1994 and 2007. Nightingales are down 60% since 1994, wood warblers 67% down, turtle doves 66% down, spotted flycatchers down 59%, and cuckoos down 37%.

=== Winter visitors ===
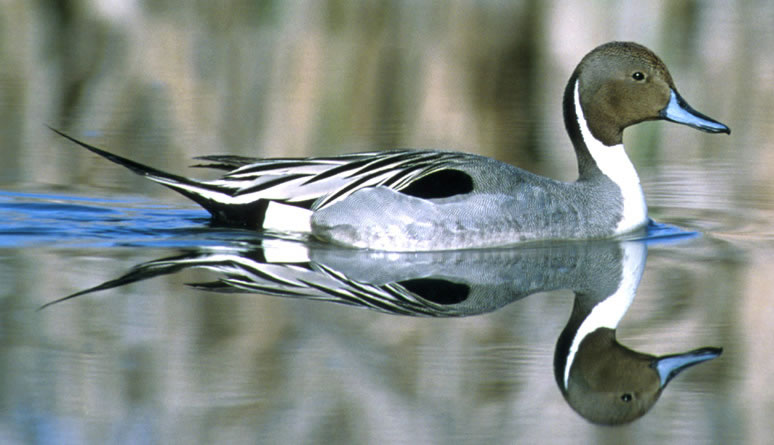
Northern pintail

The mild winters make Britain attractive to about 60 species which breed further north. These are mainly larger birds, such as swans, geese, ducks, gulls and thrushes, but some smaller species, such as the snow bunting and brambling also arrive in large numbers.

The numbers of some eruptive species, like Bohemian waxwing, depend on food supplies and population numbers in their breeding areas.

=== Passage migrants ===
Some species neither regularly breed nor winter in Great Britain, but pass through on migration often in large numbers. Arctic breeding waders are a good example, with species such as little stint and curlew sandpiper usually being fairly common on passage.

The numbers of some passage birds depend on weather conditions. There will be more Mediterranean visitors like hoopoes and Alpine swifts in spring if there are winds from the south encouraging an overshoot of the breeding areas.

In both spring and autumn, the numbers of Scandinavian breeders such as bluethroat and wryneck are linked to the prevalence of easterly winds.

Perhaps also best placed in this category are a few seabirds which breed in the southern hemisphere, but "winter" in the northern hemisphere during the northern summer. These are seen off the south west of Britain in autumn. They are the great shearwater, sooty shearwater and the rare Wilson's petrel.

=== Rarities ===
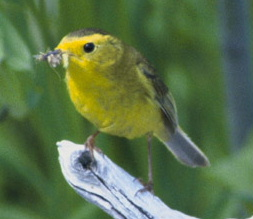
Wilson's warbler

One of the fascinations of the British list is the number of rarities. Because of its position on the western fringes of Europe, Britain receives a number of vagrants from North America. Some American gulls, ducks and waders are regular enough to not be considered rare. These include ring-billed gull, surf scoter and pectoral sandpiper. Rare American passerines include red-eyed vireo and blackpoll warbler.

Some rarities breed in Europe, but are short-distance migrants which rarely make it to Great Britain. Examples are crested lark and Marmora's warbler.

Siberian species such as yellow-browed warbler and Pechora pipit also occur much more regularly in Britain than further east in Europe. This is because migrating birds are likely to rest on the well-watched eastern coast after crossing the North Sea.

Only one exclusively sub-Saharan breeder has reached Britain, although it has done so twice. This is Allen's gallinule.

Seabird rarities can of course reach Britain from great distances. Amongst the more improbable wanderers to Britain, perhaps the most surprising is the ancient murrelet from the Pacific.

== Introduced species ==
Britain's climate militates against the profusion of introduced species that can be found in warmer places like Florida, but there are populations of nine self-supporting species that have been admitted to the British list. In addition, there are feral populations of Canada goose, greylag goose and other wildfowl which would be on the British list anyway through wild breeders or vagrants.

The introduced species admitted to the British list are:

- Egyptian goose, Alopochen aegyptiacus
- Ruddy duck, Oxyura jamaicensis
- Mandarin, Aix galericulata
- Red-legged partridge, Alectoris rufa
- Golden pheasant, Chrysolophus pictus
- Lady Amherst's pheasant, Chrysolophus amherstiae
- Common pheasant, Phasianus colchicus
- Rose-ringed parakeet, Psittacula krameri
- Little owl, Athene noctua

Western capercaillie, Tetrao urogallus, and white-tailed eagle, Haliaeetus albicilla, are reintroductions of formerly breeding species.

== See also ==
- Feral parakeets in Great Britain
- List of birds of Wales
- Fauna of Scotland
