= Harrison Institute =

British mammal taxonomy and biodiversity studies charity

Founded in 1930, the Harrison Institute is a UK charity that specialises in mammal taxonomy and biodiversity studies in the Old World tropics and subtropics, especially southern and southeast Asia, Arabia and eastern Africa.

== Mission ==
The Harrison Institute seeks to promote and facilitate biodiversity conservation through:

- Collaborative scientific research
- Training staff and students from UK and foreign institutions
- Promoting international scientific networks

The Harrison Institute provides training for counterparts from a range of Eurasian and African countries. Capacity building and skills development are offered in a series of subjects including project design, field survey techniques, analysing data, preparing scientific reports and publications and the conservation and management of zoological collections.

== Zoological collections ==
The Harrison Institute is home to over 50,000 scientific specimens. Its collection includes 33,000 recent and fossil mammals and 19,000 birds. The fossil mammal collection is growing rapidly and contains holdings of national and international importance. These include Quaternary faunas from the UK and Poland and Tertiary faunas from the UK. The Recent bird collection is the oldest collection in the institute with some specimens prepared in the first half of the 19th century. The collection was obtained by James and Jeffery Harrison and is focused on the Palaearctic region, with an emphasis on wildfowl. It includes the Ticehurst and Billy Paine collections and some of the Hastings Rarities. The institute's collection of 19,000 birds, representing 884 species, was donated to the Vienna Natural History Museum in 2022 for the purposes of scientific research.

== Expeditions ==
In the last 50 years the Harrison Institute has organised or participated in over 75 field surveys and expeditions to 36 countries in 5 continents. Each has been concerned with an aspect of natural history and was part of a wider programme of conservation or wildlife studies involving scientific institutions from the host country.

== History ==
The Harrison Institute was founded by James Harrison in 1930. Based at Bowerwood House in Sevenoaks, some 40 km from central London, the Institute originally focused on the study of British and Palaearctic birds. In 1971, its zoological collections were recognised as being of national and international importance and it became a charitable trust (No 268830). In 1986, it was further recognised as a Registered Scientific Institution by the then Department of the Environment (now the Department for Environment, Food and Rural Affairs), a UK Government Department and was listed under CITES.

Under the leadership of David Harrison (James's younger son), the Institute increasingly focused on the study and conservation of mammals. Conservation initiatives were concentrated in Arabia and scientific publications were primarily concerned with the Old World tropics and subtropics. More recently, the institute has been involved in research, training and scientific expeditions to East Africa, the Indian Subcontinent and South-East Asia. It also researches the Tertiary and Quaternary UK mammal faunas.

== See also ==
- George Bristow
- Hastings Rarities
