= James Maurice Harrison =

James Maurice Harrison (13 February 1892 – 4 December 1971) was a British physician and amateur ornithologist. He studied the birds of the Kent region where he lived and took an interest in plumage aberrations and topics with close links to medicine. He also wrote a defence of George Bristow in the Hastings Rarities case. His son Jeffery also took an interest in birds.

Harrison was born to Kathleen Elizabeth Lakin and Frederick Angier Harrison who was a director at St Thomas Hospital. He studied at Malvern and Felsted before going to study medicine at St. Thomas' Hospital. In World War I he served as a navy surgeon and rose to the position of Surgeon Lieutenant. He was the sole officer to survive the sinking of Monitor 28 and received a Distinguished Service Cross for saving a marine. He moved to Sevenoaks in 1920 as a general practitioner until 1969. He also served as a resident surgeon at Sevenoaks Hospital.

Harrison married Rita Graham Sorley in 1918 and they had a son, Jeffery Graham who also became an ornithologist. Harrison took an interest in birds and painting in his spare time. His first major bird study was on the avifauna of Macedonia. He then made numerous journeys to study birds in Europe and northern Africa. He also collected specimens and used his taxidermist skills to mount them in a home museum which later became the Harrison Institute.

Harrison's books include:

- The Birds of Kent (1953, in two volumes)
- Bristow and the Hastings Rarities Affair (1968)
- Bird Taxidermy (1964)

He also contributed to The Ornithologists' Guide (1956) and A New Dictionary of Birds (1964).
