= Hugh Whistler =

English police officer and ornithologist

Hugh Whistler (28 September 1889 – 7 July 1943), F.Z.S., M.B.O.U. was an English police officer and ornithologist who worked in India. He wrote one of the first field guides to Indian birds and documented the distributions of birds in notes in several journals apart from describing new subspecies.

== Life and career ==
Hugh was the first son of Major Fuller Whistler of the Highland Light Infantry and Gwenllian Annie (née Robinson) and was born at Mablethorpe in 1889. He was the first cousin of Major-General Michael Whistler and the nephew of Charles Whistler. Whistler was educated at Aldenham School. His younger brother Ralfe Allen Fuller Whistler (24 July 1895 – 28 April 1917) followed after his father and joined the Highland Light Infantry while Hugh went to serve with the Indian police mainly in the Punjab.

He served in India from December 1909 to April 1926. He was initially posted at Phillaur but was later to serve across Punjab including districts such as Jhang that were considered unpopular. He was posted in other regions including the Himalayan foothills of Kangra, and the high Himalayas of Lahul and Spiti. He began to correspond with Claud Buchanan Ticehurst and, when on leave in England in 1910, he visited Grove House at Lowestoft and was introduced to scientific ornithology. Wherever he was posted, he took an interest in the local birdlife, keeping careful notes and making collections. In 1924 he returned to England and made a trip to Spain with Ticehurst.

On 2 October 1925 Whistler married Margaret Joan Ashton (1893–1981) daughter of Thomas Gair Ashton, 1st Baron Ashton of Hyde and Eva Margaret James who were from near his own home in Battle. He died on 7 July 1943 leaving behind a daughter Benedicta and son Ralfe (both now deceased).

== Ornithology ==
Whistler studied and collected birds wherever he was posted in India. On retiring to England he continued his research into Indian ornithology. He published extensively in the Journal of the Bombay Natural History Society, making notes on the occurrence and on the distributions of geographic plumage variations. He published a ten-part introduction to the study of birds in India. He made collecting trips to Spain, Albania, Italy and Algeria often in the company of Claud Buchanan Ticehurst.

Around 1925 a plan was made by W S Millard, Sir George Lowndes and F J Mitchell to produce an illustrated guide to the birds of India for beginners. Whistler was asked to help in its writing. It was eventually published in 1928 as the Popular Handbook of Indian Birds. Four later editions of this publication were issued, and the last was published after his death. In this work he foresaw the value of popularizing observation-based ornithology:

The day is now over in which it was necessary to collect large series of skins and eggs in India. Enough general collecting has been done; concentration on filling in the gaps in our knowledge is now needed. Those who wish to help in the work should first familiarise themselves with what has been accomplished and learn what remains to be done. With some species the distribution of the different races still needs to be worked out and this implies careful collecting in certain areas. Of other species we still need to know the plumage changes; for this specimens collected at certain times of the year are required. In other species the down and juvenile plumages are unknown. But the greatest need of all is accurate observations on status and migration. In this all can help. Keep full notes for a year on the birds of your station, noting those that are resident and the times of arrival and departure, comparative abundance and scarcity of all the migratory kinds; and you will have made a contribution to ornithology that will in the measure of its accuracy and fullness be a help to every other worker.

Whistler lived at Battle, East Sussex during his retirement, where he was a Justice of the Peace. He made one trip to India in 1928 as a guest of Admiral Hubert Lynes with the intention of studying the birds of Kashmir. Lynes was recalled to England and insisted that Whistler and Bertram Beresford Osmaston complete the bird survey. He joined the British Ornithologists' Union in 1913 and in 1940 served as its as vice-president. He visited Kashmir with Admiral Lynes and wanted to produce an account of the birds of Punjab and Kashmir; this was not completed.

He was also interested in hounds, pheasant rearing, falconry and was an antiquarian. He was for a while involved in the care of Bodiam Castle. Whistler was a very careful and critical observer noted for his "capacity for taking pains".

He was skeptical of George Bristow and his observations which was later to become famous as the Hastings Rarities scandal. Whistler was critical of egg collection driven by trade and remarked on the unscrupulous collection that he heard of from a correspondent in the Khasi hills. He further remarked that eggs from Assam or Sikkim be treated with caution by oologists. This article was reacted to by E C Stuart Baker.

Several subspecies of birds were named after him including some by Ticehurst, Delacour and Stresemann. Whistler's warbler originally described as Seicercus burkii whistleri is now considered a full species: Seicercus whistleri. The Whistler Prize of Sussex University, awarded to the best essay on natural history or archaeology, is named after him. His collection of 17,320 bird skins was presented to the Natural History Museum by Mrs Whistler in 1949.

== Writings ==
A partial list of Whistler's writings includes:

- Whistler, H (1916). "Notes on the birds of the Jhelum District of the Punjab with notes on the collection by Claud Ticehurst". Ibis: 35–118. doi:10.1111/j.1474-919X.1916.tb07842.x.
- Whistler, Hugh (1919). "Wagtails at roost (30 March 1919)". Bird Notes. 2 (6): 101–103.
- Whistler, Hugh (1919). "The Norfolk Plover in India". 2 (7): 164–166.
- Whistler, Hugh (1949). Popular Handbook of Indian Birds (4 ed.). Gurney and Jackson. (Edition 3 (1941))
- Whistler H (1944) The Avifaunal Survey of Ceylon conducted jointly by the British and Colombo Museums. Spolia Zeylanica 23: 119–321. (posthumous)
- Whistler, H. (1924). In the high Himalayas. London: H.F.& G. Witherby.
- Whistler, Huqh (1926). "The Birds of the Kangra District, Punjab". Ibis. 68 (3): 521–581. doi:10.1111/j.1474-919X.1926.tb05625.x.
- Whistler, Hugh (1926). "XXXII.-The Birds of the Kangra District, Punjab. Part II". Ibis. 68 (4): 724–783. doi:10.1111/j.1474-919X.1926.tb05635.x.
- Whistler, H. (1928). "The study of Indian birds. Part I. The origin of birds". J. Bombay Nat. Hist. Soc. 33 (1): 166–176.
- Whistler, H. (1929). "The study of Indian birds. Part II. Some external characteristics of birds. The Feathers". J. Bombay Nat. Hist. Soc. 33 (2): 311–325.
- Whistler, H. (1929). "The study of Indian birds. Part III. Some external characteristics of birds. The beak". J. Bombay Nat. Hist. Soc. 33 (4): 776–792.
- Whistler, H. (1929). "Some aspects of bird-life in Kashmir". Himalayan Journal. 1 (1): 29–50.
- Whistler, H. (1930). "The study of Indian birds, Part IV. Some external characteristics of birds. The Wings". J. Bombay Nat. Hist. Soc. 34 (1): 27–39.
- Whistler, H. (1930). "The study of Indian birds. Part V. Some external characteristics of a bird. The foot". J. Bombay Nat. Hist. Soc. 34 (2): 276–290.
- Whistler, H. (1930). "The study of Indian birds. Part VI. Some external characteristics of a bird". J. Bombay Nat. Hist. Soc. 34 (3): 720–735.
- Whistler, H. (1931). "The study of Indian birds. Part VII. The Reproduction of birds". J. Bombay Nat. Hist. Soc. 35 (1): 89–103.
- Whistler, H. (1931). "The study of Indian birds. Part VIII. The Reproduction of birds. The Nest". J. Bombay Nat. Hist. Soc. 35 (2): 312–324.
- Whistler, H. (1932). "The study of Indian birds. Part IX. The reproduction of birds. The egg". J. Bombay Nat. Hist. Soc. 35 (3): 635–644.
- Whistler, H. (1932). "The study of Indian birds. Part X. Migration". J. Bombay Nat. Hist. Soc. 35 (4): 848–860.
- Whistler, H. (1916). "Migration notes from a passenger-steamer". Zoologist. 20: 453–458.
- Whistler, H. (1908). "Rough notes in East Sussex". Zoologist. 12: 345–349.
- Whistler, H. (1906). "Variety of the Common Wren (Troglodytes parvulus)". Zoologist. 10: 391–392.
- Whistler, Hugh (1905). "Birds noticed during a short visit to Suffolk". The Avicultural Magazine. 3 (5): 165–168.
