= Category F =

Category F can refer to:

- Category F railway stations (DfT)
- Category F necrophilia, known as catathymic
- Category F attack aircraft (US)
- Category F, for a nuclear weapons security device
- Category F birds (Great Britain), includes species recorded before 1800 including fossil species
- Category F license, for credit reference agencies
