= David Harrison (zoologist) =

English zoologist

David Lakin Harrison (1 October 1926 – 19 March 2015) was an English zoologist who established, with his family, the Harrison Zoological Museum, later known as the Harrison Institute.
