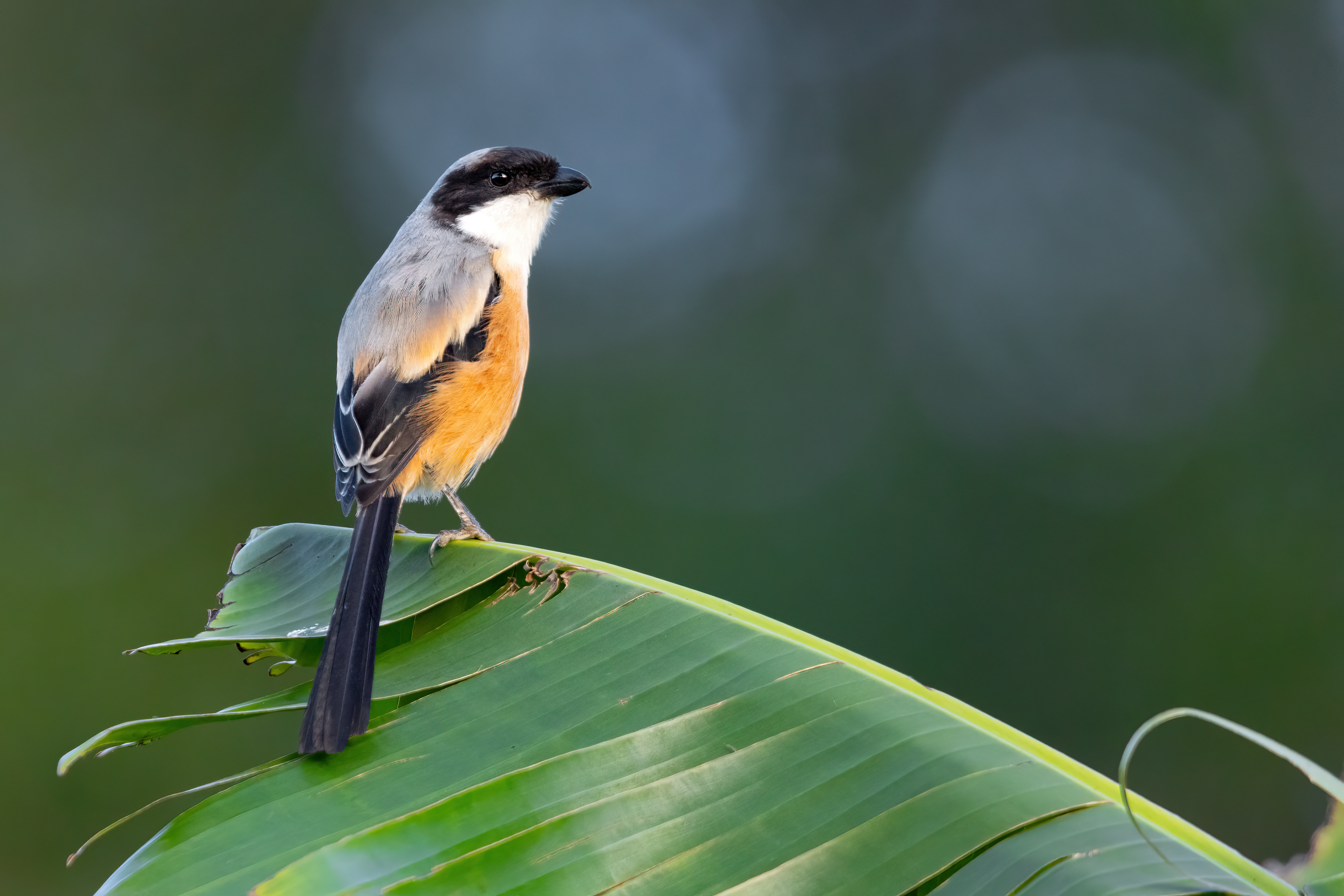
- Long tailed shrike in Sumatra, Indonesia

Conservation status
- Least Concern (IUCN 3.1)

Scientific classification
- Kingdom: Animalia
- Phylum: Chordata
- Class: Aves
- Order: Passeriformes
- Family: Laniidae
- Genus: Lanius
- Species: L. schach

Binomial name
- Lanius schach Linnaeus, 1758

Subspecies
- L. s. stresemanni Mertens, 1923; L. s. bentet Horsfield, 1822; L. s. suluensis (Mearns, 1905); L. s. nasutus Scopoli, 1780; L. s. schach Linnaeus, 1758; L. s. longicaudatus Ogilvie-Grant, 1902; L. s. tricolor Hodgson, 1837; L. s. caniceps Blyth, 1846; L. s. erythronotus (Vigors, 1831)
- Rough distribution of key forms

= Long-tailed shrike =

Species of bird

L. s. erythronotus Bharatpur, Rajasthan, India

The long-tailed shrike or rufous-backed shrike (Lanius schach) is a member of the bird family Laniidae, the shrikes. They are found widely distributed across Asia and there are variations in plumage across the range. The species ranges across much of Asia, both on the mainland and the eastern archipelagos. The eastern or Himalayan subspecies, L. s. tricolor, is sometimes called the black-headed shrike. Although there are considerable differences in plumage among the subspecies, they all have a long and narrow black tail, have a black mask and forehead, rufous rump and flanks and a small white patch on the shoulder. It is considered to form a superspecies with the grey-backed shrike (Lanius tephronotus) which breeds on the Tibetan Plateau.

== Taxonomy ==
The long-tailed shrike was formally described by the Swedish naturalist Carl Linnaeus in 1758 in the tenth edition of his Systema Naturae under the binomial name Lanius schach. Linnaeus cited the description that the Swedish explorer Pehr Osbeck had included in the account of his stay in China. The type locality is the Canton area of China. The genus name, Lanius, is derived from the Latin word for "butcher", and some shrikes are also known as "butcher birds" because of their feeding habits. The specific schach is an onomatopoeic name based on the call. The common English name "shrike" is from Old English scríc, "shriek", referring to the shrill call.

Nine subspecies are recognised:

- L. s. erythronotus (Vigors, 1831) – south Kazakhstan to northeast Iran, Afghanistan, Pakistan and north-central India
- L. s. caniceps Blyth, 1846 – west, central, south India and Sri Lanka
- L. s. tricolor Hodgson, 1837 – Nepal and east India through Myanmar and south China to north Laos and north Thailand
- L. s. schach Linnaeus, 1758 – central, southeast China to north Vietnam
- L. s. longicaudatus Ogilvie-Grant, 1902 – central, southeast Thailand and south Laos
- L. s. bentet Horsfield, 1821 – Malay Peninsula, Greater and Lesser Sundas and Borneo
- L. s. nasutus Scopoli, 1786 – Philippines (except Palawan group and Sulu Archipelago)
- L. s. suluensis (Mearns, 1905) – Sulu Archipelago (south Philippines)
- L. s. stresemanni Mertens, 1923 – montane east New Guinea

Stuart Baker in the second edition of The Fauna of British India considered Lanius schach, Lanius tephronotus and Lanius tricolor as three species. He considered nigriceps as synonymous with tricolor and included erythronotus as a race of schach. Other treatments were proposed by Hugh Whistler and N B Kinnear where tephronotus was considered a subspecies of schach and nigriceps and nasutus grouped together. Another treatment considered tricolor as a subspecies of L. tephronotus. It was subsequently however noted that tephronotus and schach co-occurred in the Kumaon region and so the two were confirmed as distinct species. Molecular distances also indicate that they are distant enough. The erythronotus group have a grey head which continues into the back with a gradual suffusion of rufous. The westernmost population from Transcaspia named by Sergei Buturlin as jaxartensis and said to be larger, is not considered valid. A very light grey form from western dry region of India named by Walter Koelz as kathiawarensis is also considered merely as a variant. In southern India and Sri Lanka, subspecies caniceps is marked by the rufous restricted to the rump, light crown and the pure grey on the back. Biswamoy Biswas supported the view that nigriceps (having upper mantle grey and lower mantle rufous) was a hybrid of tricolor and erythronotus.

Subspecies longicaudatus has a greyer crown and is found in Thailand and Burma. The nominate subspecies is found in China from the Yangtze valley south to Hainan and Taiwan. Some individuals of the nominate form show melanism and were once described as a species fuscatus. Island forms include nasutus (Philippine Islands from Mindanao to Luzon and north Borneo), suluensis (Sulu Island), bentet (Sunda Islands and Sumatra other than Borneo) and stresemanni of New Guinea.

== Description ==
The long-tailed shrike is a typical shrike, favouring dry open habitats and found perched prominently atop a bush or on a wire. The dark mask through the eye is broad and covers the forehead in most subspecies and the whole head is black in subspecies tricolor and nasutus. The tail is narrow and graduated with pale rufous on the outer feathers. Subspecies erythronotus has the grey of the mantle and upper back suffused with rufous while the southern Indian caniceps has pure grey. A small amount of white is present at the base of the primaries. The bay-backed shrike is smaller and more contrastingly patterned and has a more prominent white patch on the wing. The sexes are alike in plumage.

== Distribution and habitat ==
The species is found across Asia from Kazakhstan to New Guinea. It is found mainly in scrub and open habitats. Many of the temperate zone populations are migratory, moving south in winter while those in the tropics tend to be sedentary although they may make short distance movements. Subspecies caniceps of southern India is found in winter in the dry coastal zone of southern India. Subspecies tricolor migrates south to Bengal in India. They are found in scrub, grassland and open land under cultivation. A survey in southern India found them to be among the commonest wintering shrikes and found at a linear density along roadsides at about 0.58 per kilometer, often choosing wires to perch.

This species is a rare vagrant to western Europe on the strength of two accepted records in Great Britain on South Uist in November 2000 and the Netherlands near Den Helder in October 2011. A bird matching the features of caniceps was seen on the island of Maldives. It has also occurred as a vagrant to Jordan, Israel, Turkey,

== Behaviour and ecology ==
The long-tailed shrike has a characteristic upright "shrike" attitude when perched on a bush, from which it glides down at an angle to take lizards, large insects, small birds and rodents. It maintains feeding territories and is usually single; pairs are well spaced out. Several individuals have been observed indulging in play behaviour fighting over perches. The usual calls are harsh grating and scolding calls, likened to the squealing of a frog caught by a snake. They are capable of vocal mimicry and include the calls of many species including lapwings, cuckoos, puppies and squirrels in their song. This singing ability makes it a popular pet in parts of Southeast Asia.

Long-tailed shrikes take a wide variety of animal prey. On occasion, they have been noted capturing fish from a stream. They also take small snakes. It sometimes indulges in kleptoparasitism and takes prey from other birds. It also captures flying insects in the air. They sometimes impale prey on a thorny bush after feeding just on the head or brain. They have been reported to feed on the fruits of the neem in Kerala, even attempting to impale them on a twig.

The breeding season is in summer in the temperate ranges. The nest is a deep and loose cup made up of thorny twigs, rags and hair. This is placed in a thorny bush, trees such as Flacourtia and wild date palms (Phoenix). The usual clutch is about 3 to 6 eggs which are incubated by both sexes. The eggs hatch after about 13 to 16 days. Young chicks are often fed with pieces of small birds captured by the parents. A second brood may be raised in the same nest. They are sometimes parasitized by cuckoos such as the common cuckoo (Dehra Dun), common hawk-cuckoo, Jacobin cuckoo and the Asian koel in Bangladesh.
