= Brown flycatcher =

Brown flycatcher may refer to:

- Southern shrikebill, a species of flycatcher found in New Caledonia and Vanuatu
- Asian brown flycatcher, a species of flycatcher found in southern and eastern Asia, and Indonesia
