= Hastings Rarities =

Ornithological fraud

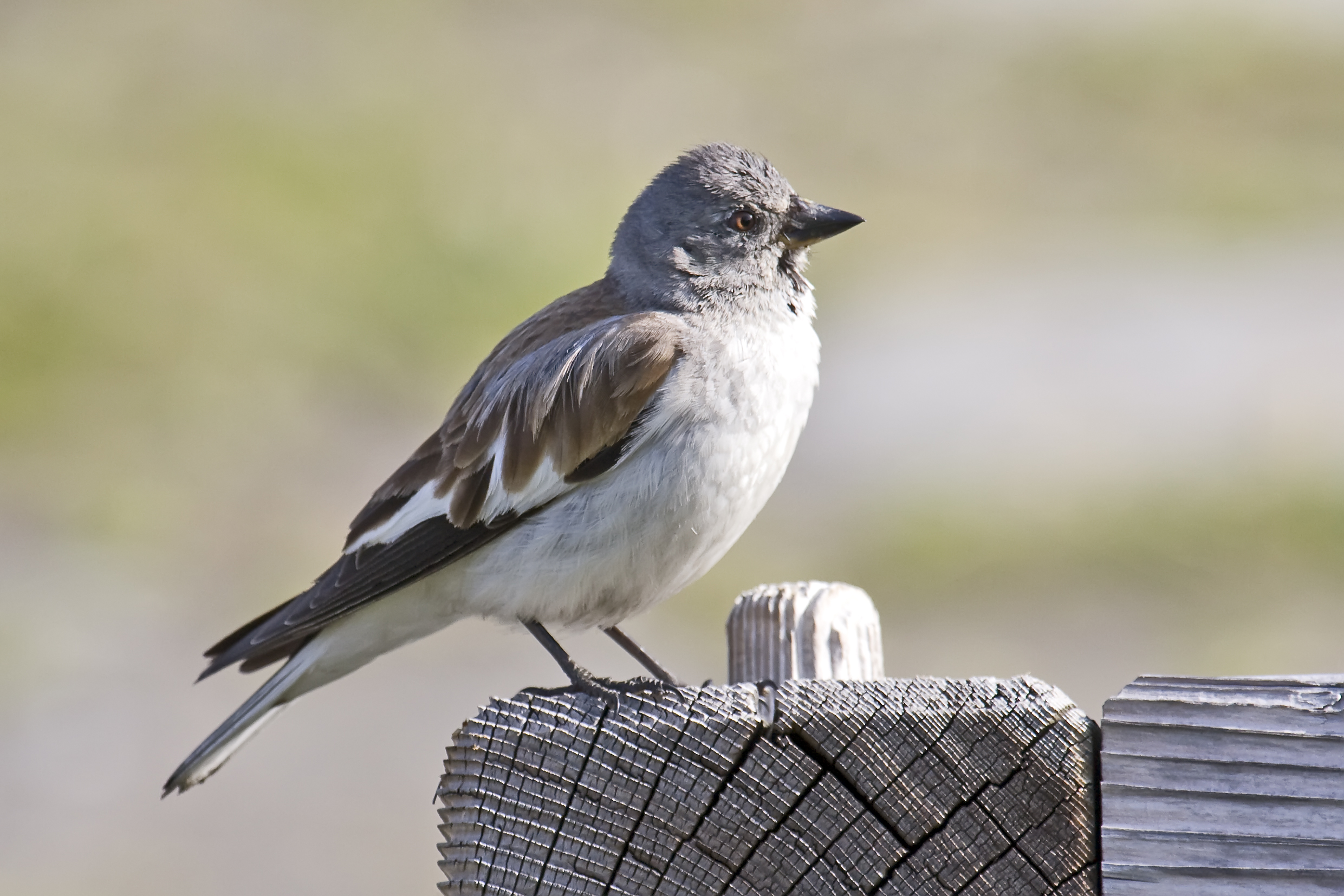
The white-winged snowfinch was one of the bird species dropped from the British Bird List following the exposure of the fraud in 1962.

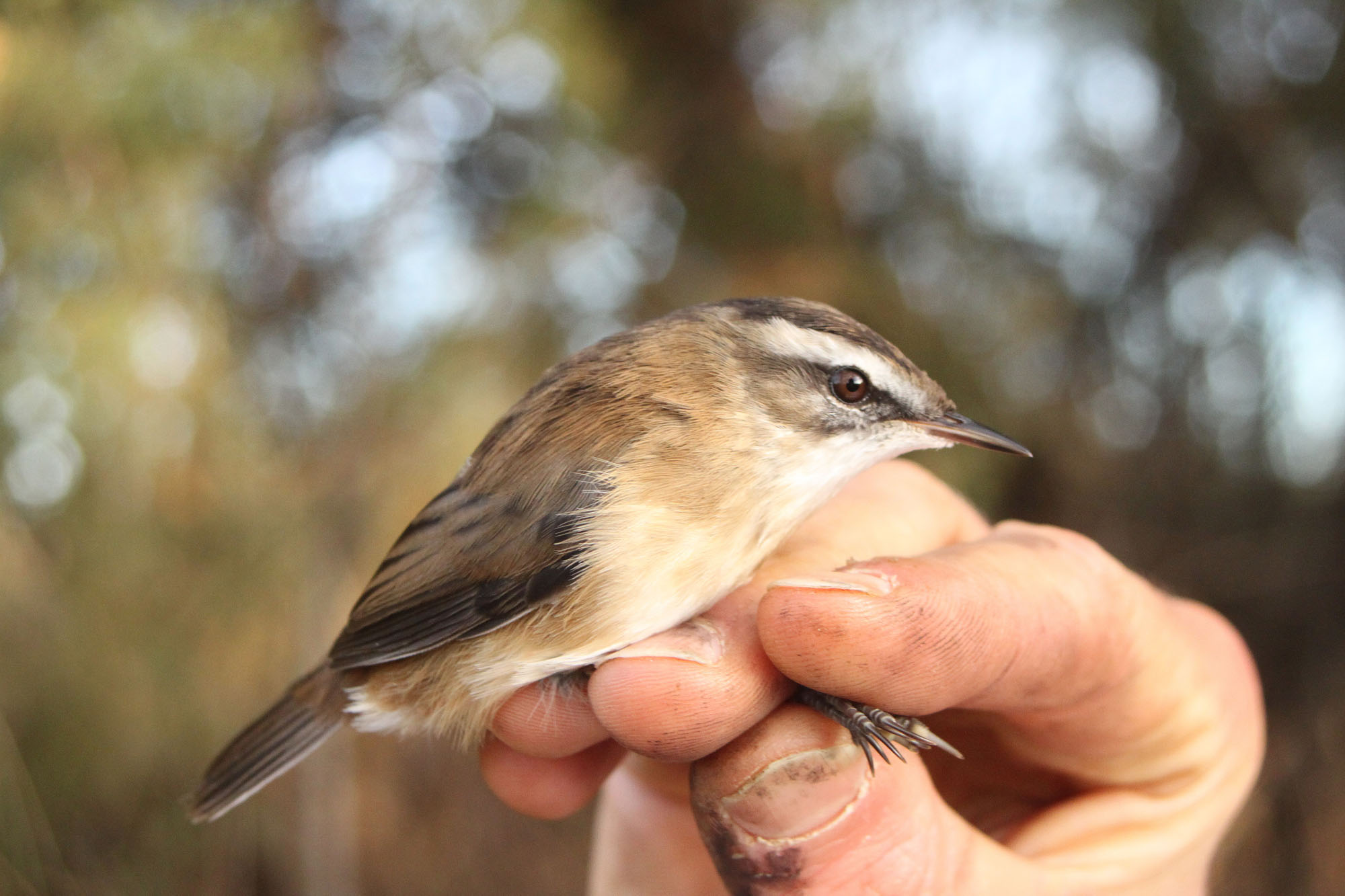
Another species dropped from the list was the moustached warbler.

The Hastings Rarities affair is a case of statistically demonstrated ornithological fraud that misled the bird world for decades in the 20th century. The discovery of the long-running hoax shocked ornithologists.

The Hastings Rarities were a series of records of rare birds added to the British list on the basis of hundreds of reports, supported by preserved specimens, from George Bristow (1863–1947), a taxidermist and gunsmith of St Leonards-on-Sea, a town on the south coast of England. His reports were made between 1892 and 1930.

In August 1962, the statistician John Nelder published an analysis in the journal British Birds, demonstrating that the records were unlikely to be genuine. This was supported by an editorial in the same issue. 29 bird species or subspecies were dropped from the British List. On the basis of later records from elsewhere in Britain, most have subsequently been readmitted.

== History ==
Two articles in the August 1962 issue of the journal British Birds, one a statistical examination by John Nelder, the other an editorial by Max Nicholson and James Ferguson-Lees, made a case using several statistical measures that a series of records of rare birds collected within a 20-mile (32 km) radius of Hastings, in Kent and Sussex, south-east England, between 1892 and 1930, should be treated with suspicion. As a result, 29 bird species or subspecies were dropped from the British List (though most of these have subsequent acceptable records from elsewhere in Britain) and 550 records, relating to 80–90 species, were rejected. Although some of these rejected records were undoubtedly good ones, there was no easy way of distinguishing them.

Although doubts had been expressed privately for many years about the provenance of many specimens from the Hastings area, until the articles appeared there had been no systematic investigation of the records. The case made in British Birds was essentially statistical, concerning the unlikelihood of so many records of rare or new species being made within a limited area and limited time period when compared with a similar area and with earlier and later time periods. However, most records recommended for rejection were of specimens that had passed through the hands of George Bristow (1863–1947), a taxidermist and gunsmith of St Leonards-on-Sea in the borough of Hastings.

It was clear that Bristow was suspected of having been the perpetrator of a series of frauds, carried out from the 1890s over at least the first two, and possibly three, decades of the 20th century, through importing bird specimens from outside the British Isles, and selling them to wealthy ornithologists, such as Walter Rothschild, as having been procured from the Hastings area. John Nelder later estimated that Bristow had made about £7000, a considerable amount of money at the time, from this scheme, although there is considerable dispute as to how much Bristow might really have made from his sales.

The deletion of several taxa from the list had considerable repercussions. As the suspect records covered nearly four decades, many had been incorporated into books about birds in Britain, including major ornithological reference works, and there was resistance from some ornithologists to accepting the deletions. David Bannerman, in the late stages of completing his monumental The Birds of the British Isles (12 vols, 1933–63), decided to maintain his faith in the validity of the controversial Hastings records and ignore the decision to delete them from the list. Since then, most of the species dropped have been readmitted to the list on the basis of reliable subsequent records.

== Surviving specimens ==
Fifty of the rarities are held in the Birmingham Museums Trust natural history collection.

== Bird species dropped from the British List in 1962 ==
- Cory's shearwater – since readmitted
- Slender-billed curlew – since readmitted but subsequently removed
- Grey-tailed tattler – since readmitted
- Terek sandpiper – since readmitted
- Semipalmated sandpiper – since readmitted
- Black lark – since readmitted
- Calandra lark – since readmitted
- Cetti's warbler – since readmitted
- Moustached warbler
- Olivaceous warbler – since readmitted
- Rüppell's warbler – since readmitted
- Sardinian warbler – since readmitted
- Brown flycatcher – since readmitted
- Collared flycatcher – since readmitted
- Masked shrike – since readmitted
- White-winged snowfinch

== Sources ==
- Harrison, James M. (1968). Bristow and the Hastings Rarities Affair. A. H. Butler: St Leonards-on-Sea, U.K.
- Nelder, J. A. (August 1962). "A statistical examination of the Hastings Rarities". British Birds. 55 (8): 283–298.
- Nicholson, E. M.; Ferguson-Lees, I. J. (August 1962). "The Hastings Rarities". British Birds. 55 (8): 299–384.
- Seabrook, John. (2006). Ruffled feathers. Uncovering the biggest scandal in the bird world. The New Yorker, 29 May 2006: 50–61.
- Senn, Stephen. (2003). A conversation with John Nelder. Statistical Science 18(1): 118–131.
