= George Bristow (ornithologist) =

English taxidermist and gunsmith (1863–1947)

George Bristow (1863 – 14 April 1947) was an English taxidermist and gunsmith of St Leonards-on-Sea in the borough of Hastings, East Sussex, in the southeast of England.

He is chiefly remembered as the perpetrator of the long-running "Hastings Rarities" hoax, in which he succeeded in adding 29 species or subspecies of birds to the British List, and defrauded his clients of some £7000 for specimens on the basis that they were British.

== Life ==
Bristow served an apprenticeship in taxidermy before working in the family business, established in 1845, at an unpretentious shop at 15 Silchester Road, St Leonards-on-Sea. From the 1890s until the 1930s much of his business involved the procurement of wild birds by himself and others to be made into display specimens or study skins for sale to ornithologists and collectors.

== The Hastings Rarities fraud ==
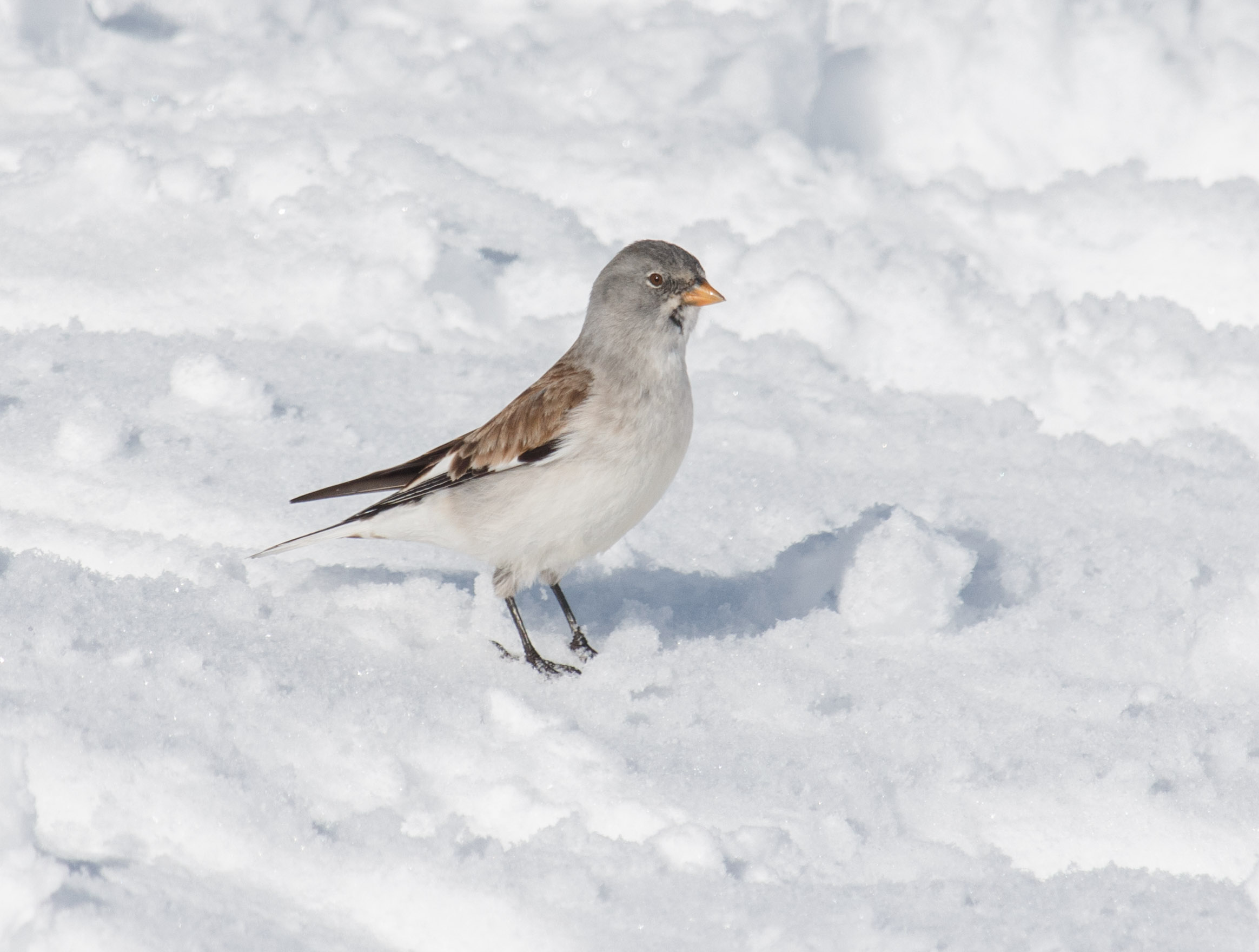
White-winged snowfinch (Montifringilla nivalis), one of the species added to the British Bird List from Bristow's Hastings Rarities affair.

Among the specimens sold by Bristow were surprising numbers of birds which, though purported to have been shot locally, were considered either rare vagrants to the area or were new to the British List. Although some ornithologists held doubts about the provenance of such specimens, it was not until 1962, well after Bristow's death, that an article by the statistician John Nelder in British Birds, looking at the statistics of ornithological records from the Hastings area, publicly cast doubt on many records, with the implication of extensive serial fraud. The resulting scandal was known as the Hastings Rarities affair, with Bristow the central figure as the presumed perpetrator of the fraud. Nelder estimated that specimens to the value of £7000 had been sold between 1892 and 1930.

== Sources ==
- Harrison, James M. (1968). Bristow and the Hastings Rarities Affair. A.H. Butler: St Leonards-on-Sea, U.K.
- Nelder, J.A. (1962). A statistical examination of the Hastings Rarities. British Birds, August 1962.
