= List of birds of Great Britain =

This list of birds of Great Britain comprises all bird species that have been recorded in a wild state in Great Britain. It follows the official British List, maintained by the British Ornithologists' Union (BOU). Decisions relating to the British List are published by the British Ornithologists' Union Records Committee (BOURC) in its annual reports in the BOU's journal Ibis. These reports were formerly geographically based and included the whole of the British Isles, but records for the Republic of Ireland and Northern Ireland are now published by their own ornithological associations. Records from the Isle of Man are adjudicated by the Manx Ornithological Society.

Bird species admitted to the British List are those in BOU categories A, B or C:

- A: species that have been recorded in an apparently natural state at least once since 1 January 1950.
- B: species that were recorded in an apparently natural state at least once between 1 January 1800 and 31 December 1949, but have not been recorded subsequently.
- C: species that, although originally introduced by humans, either deliberately or accidentally, have established breeding populations derived from introduced stock, which maintain themselves without necessary recourse to further introduction.

Birds can be listed in more than one category: for example, the Canada goose has a large introduced population but there have also been a few naturally occurring vagrants, and the white-tailed eagle is a native species that is also subject to an ongoing reintroduction project, so both species meet the criteria for categories A and C.

Categories D and E (not listed here) are used for record keeping only, and species in these categories are not included in the British List:

- D: species that would otherwise appear in categories A or B except that there is reasonable doubt that they have ever occurred in a natural state.
- E: species that have been recorded as introductions, transportees, or escapees from captivity, and whose breeding populations (if any) are not believed to be self-sustaining.

A further category (not listed here) is being compiled:

- F: species recorded before 1800, including fossil species.

As of 13 August 2024, there are 641 species of birds on the British List, the latest addition being western olivaceous warbler on 20-21 October 2023. Five species groups (birds that were not identified to species level) are included in an appendix to the December 2023 amendment – southern/northern giant petrel (Macronectes giganteus/halli), Fea's/Desertas petrel (Pterodroma feae/desertas), black-bellied/white-bellied storm petrel (Fregetta tropica/grallaria), brown/south polar skua (Stercorarius antarctica/maccormickii), and Asian/Mediterranean/Turkestan short-toed lark (Alaudala cheleensis/rufescens/heinei). A number of additional species are awaiting consideration by the British Ornithologists' Union Records Committee.

Species listed on this page as "rare" are those for which a full description is required for acceptance of the record by the British Birds Rarities Committee. Other species have an indication of their breeding and wintering status in Great Britain.

In general the avifauna of Britain is similar to that of the rest of Europe. Because of its mild winters, Great Britain has a considerable population of wintering species, particularly ducks, geese and swans. There are also a number of species, such as the oystercatcher, that are resident on the island of Great Britain, but migrants elsewhere. Britain receives a number of vagrants from Asia and North America. Some American gulls, ducks and waders are regular enough not to be considered rare, including the ring-billed gull, surf scoter and pectoral sandpiper. There is one endemic bird found in Great Britain, the Scottish crossbill, though its species status is uncertain and controversial; the red grouse is near-endemic, occurring in only Great Britain and neighbouring Ireland.

== Ducks, geese, and swans ==
Order: Anseriformes Family: Anatidae

The swans, ducks and geese are medium to large birds that are adapted to an aquatic existence with webbed feet and bills which are flattened to a greater or lesser extent. In many ducks the male is colourful while the female is dull brown. The diet consists of a variety of animals and plants. The family is well represented in Britain, especially in winter when large numbers visit from Greenland, Scandinavia and Russia.

Common and binomial names	Image	Status	Conservation status
Brent goose (Branta bernicla)		A – winter visitor	LC
Red-breasted goose (Branta ruficollis)		A – rare vagrant	VU
Canada goose (Branta canadensis)		A & C – resident introduced population, some wild vagrants	LC
Barnacle goose (Branta leucopsis)		A & C – winter visitor and resident introduced population	LC
Cackling goose (Branta hutchinsii)		A – rare vagrant	LC
Ross's goose (Anser rossii)		A – rare vagrant	LC
Snow goose (Anser caerulescens)		A & C – some wild vagrants, also a very small feral introduced population	LC
Greylag goose (Anser anser)		A & C – resident wild and feral populations, winter visitor	LC
Taiga bean goose (Anser fabalis)		A – winter visitor	LC
Pink-footed goose (Anser brachyrhynchus)		A – winter visitor	LC
Tundra bean goose (Anser serrirostris)		A – winter visitor	
White-fronted goose (Anser albifrons)		A – winter visitor	VU
Lesser white-fronted goose (Anser erythropus)		A – rare vagrant	VU
Mute swan (Cygnus olor)		A & C – resident breeding species	LC
Bewick's swan (Cygnus columbianus)		A – winter visitor	VU
Whooper swan (Cygnus cygnus)		A – winter visitor and occasional breeder	LC
Egyptian goose (Alopochen aegyptiaca)		C – resident introduced population	LC
Common shelduck (Tadorna tadorna)		A – resident breeder and winter visitor	LC
Ruddy shelduck (Tadorna ferruginea)		B – numerous records since 1946 are presumed feral or escapes from captivity	LC
Mandarin duck (Aix galericulata)		C – resident introduced population	LC
Baikal teal (Sibirionetta formosa)		A – rare vagrant	LC
Garganey (Spatula querquedula)		A – breeding summer visitor	LC
Blue-winged teal (Spatula discors)		A – rare vagrant	LC
Northern shoveler (Spatula clypeata)		A – resident breeder and winter visitor	LC
Gadwall (Mareca strepera)		A & C – resident breeder and winter visitor	LC
Falcated duck (Mareca falcata)		A – rare vagrant	LC
Eurasian wigeon (Mareca penelope)		A – resident breeder and winter visitor	LC
American wigeon (Mareca americana)		A – scarce migrant	LC
Mallard (Anas platyrhynchos)		A & C – resident breeder, winter visitor and naturalised releases	LC
American black duck (Anas rubripes)		A – rare vagrant	LC
Northern pintail (Anas acuta)		A – resident breeder and winter visitor	LC
Eurasian teal (Anas crecca)		A – resident breeder and winter visitor	LC
Green-winged teal (Anas carolinensis)		A – scarce migrant	LC
Red-crested pochard (Netta rufina)		A & C – scarce migrant and introduced breeder	LC
Canvasback (Aythya valisineria)		A – rare vagrant	LC
Redhead (Aythya americana)		A – rare vagrant	LC
Common pochard (Aythya ferina)		A – resident breeder and winter visitor	VU
Ferruginous duck (Aythya nyroca)		A – scarce migrant	LC
Ring-necked duck (Aythya collaris)		A – scarce migrant	LC
Tufted duck (Aythya fuligula)		A – resident breeder and winter visitor	NT
Greater scaup (Aythya marila)		A – winter visitor and occasional breeder	LC
Lesser scaup (Aythya affinis)		A – rare vagrant	LC
Steller's eider (Polysticta stelleri)		A – rare vagrant	LC
King eider (Somateria spectabilis)		A – rare vagrant	LC
Common eider (Somateria mollissima)		A – resident breeder and winter visitor	EN
Harlequin duck (Histrionicus histrionicus)		A – rare vagrant	LC
Surf scoter (Melanitta perspicillata)		A – scarce migrant	LC
Velvet scoter (Melanitta fusca)		A – winter visitor	VU
White-winged scoter (Melanitta deglandi)		A – rare vagrant	LC
Stejneger's scoter (Melanitta stejnegeri)		A – rare vagrant, first recorded 2022	LC
Common scoter (Melanitta nigra)		A – passage and winter visitor, and rare breeder	LC
Black scoter (Melanitta americana)		A – rare vagrant	NT
Long-tailed duck (Clangula hyemalis)		A – winter visitor and occasional breeder	LC
Bufflehead (Bucephala albeola)		A – rare vagrant	LC
Common goldeneye (Bucephala clangula)		A – resident breeder and winter visitor	LC
Barrow's goldeneye (Bucephala islandica)		A – rare vagrant	NT
Smew (Mergellus albellus)		A – winter visitor	LC
Hooded merganser (Lophodytes cucullatus)		A – rare vagrant	LC
Common merganser (Mergus merganser)		A – resident breeder and winter visitor	LC
Red-breasted merganser (Mergus serrator)		A – resident breeder and winter visitor	NT
Ruddy duck (Oxyura jamaicensis)		C – introduced species currently subject to an eradication programme	LC

== Pheasants, grouse, and allies ==
Order: Galliformes Family: Phasianidae

These are terrestrial species, feeding and nesting on the ground. They are variable in size but generally plump, with broad and relatively short wings. Four of these were introduced for hunting or ornamental purposes but two have now died out.

Common and binomial names	Image	Status	Conservation status
Red grouse (Lagopus scotica)		A – resident breeding species	
Rock ptarmigan (Lagopus muta)		A – resident breeding species	LC
Western capercaillie (Tetrao urogallus)		C – resident reintroduced population	LC
Black grouse (Lyrurus tetrix)		A – resident breeding species	LC
Grey partridge (Perdix perdix)		A & C – resident breeder and introduced gamebird	LC
Golden pheasant (Chrysolophus pictus)		C – former introduced population, now died out	LC
Lady Amherst's pheasant (Chrysolophus amherstiae)		C – former introduced population, now died out	LC
Ring-necked pheasant (Phasianus colchicus)		C – resident introduced population	LC
Common quail (Coturnix coturnix)		A – breeding summer visitor	NT
Red-legged partridge (Alectoris rufa)		C – resident introduced population	NT

== Nightjars and allies ==
Order: Caprimulgiformes Family: Caprimulgidae

Nightjars are medium-sized nocturnal birds that usually nest on the ground. They have long wings, short legs and very short bills. Their soft plumage is cryptically coloured to resemble bark or leaves.

Common and binomial names	Image	Status	Conservation status
Common nighthawk (Chordeiles minor)		A – rare vagrant	LC
Red-necked nightjar (Caprimulgus ruficollis)		B – rare vagrant (one record, 1856)	NT
European nightjar (Caprimulgus europaeus)		A – breeding summer visitor	LC
Egyptian nightjar (Caprimulgus aegyptius)		A – rare vagrant	LC

== Swifts ==
Order: Apodiformes Family: Apodidae The swifts are small birds which spend the majority of their lives flying. These birds have very short legs and never settle voluntarily on the ground, perching instead only on vertical surfaces.

Common and binomial names	Image	Status	Conservation status
White-throated needletail (Hirundapus caudacutus)		A – rare vagrant	LC
Chimney swift (Chaetura pelagica)		A – rare vagrant	VU
Alpine swift (Tachymarptis melba)		A – scarce migrant	LC
Common swift (Apus apus)		A – breeding summer visitor	NT
Pallid swift (Apus pallidus)		A – rare vagrant	LC
Pacific swift (Apus pacificus)		A – rare vagrant	LC
Little swift (Apus affinis)		A – rare vagrant	NT
White-rumped swift (Apus caffer)		A – rare vagrant	NT

== Bustards ==
Order: Otidiformes Family: Otididae

The bustards are a family of large, sturdy terrestrial birds native to open plains, characterized by long legs, elongated necks, and strong feet; within Great Britain, all recorded species are generally classified as rarities.

Common and binomial names	Image	Status	Conservation status
Great bustard (Otis tarda)		A – rare vagrant and recently reintroduced breeding resident species	LC
MacQueen's bustard (Chlamydotis macqueenii)		A – rare vagrant; only one record since 1950, in 1962	CR
Little bustard (Tetrax tetrax)		A – rare vagrant	VU

== Cuckoos ==
Order: Cuculiformes Family: Cuculidae

Birds of variable size with slender bodies and long tails. Some species are known for laying their eggs in the nests of other birds.

Common and binomial names	Image	Status	Conservation status
Great spotted cuckoo (Clamator glandarius)		A – rare vagrant	VU
Yellow-billed cuckoo (Coccyzus americanus)		A – rare vagrant	LC
Black-billed cuckoo (Coccyzus erythropthalmus)		A – rare vagrant	LC
Common cuckoo (Cuculus canorus)		A – breeding summer visitor	LC

== Sandgrouse ==
Order: Pterocliformes Family: Pteroclidae

Sturdy, medium-sized birds with a small head and long, pointed wings.

Common and binomial names	Image	Status	Conservation status
Pallas's sandgrouse (Syrrhaptes paradoxus)		A – rare vagrant; has bred	RE

== Pigeons and doves ==
Order: Columbiformes Family: Columbidae

Pigeons and doves are stout-bodied birds with short necks and short slender bills with a fleshy cere. There are 344 species worldwide, seven in Britain.

Common and binomial names	Image	Status	Conservation status
Rock dove or feral pigeon (Columba livia)		A & C – resident; most birds are of feral origin; wild birds in far N & W Scotland	LC
Stock dove (Columba oenas)		A – resident breeding species	LC
Common wood pigeon (Columba palumbus)		A – resident breeding species	LC
European turtle dove (Streptopelia turtur)		A – breeding summer visitor	VU
Oriental turtle dove (Streptopelia orientalis)		A – rare vagrant	LC
Eurasian collared dove (Streptopelia decaocto)		A – resident breeding species	LC
Mourning dove (Zenaida macroura)		A – rare vagrant	LC

== Rails, gallinules, and coots ==
Order: Gruiformes Family: Rallidae

These birds mainly occupy dense vegetation in damp environments near lakes, marshes or rivers. Many are shy and secretive birds, making them difficult to observe. Most species have strong legs and long toes which are well adapted to soft uneven surfaces.

Common and binomial names	Image	Status	Conservation status
Water rail (Rallus aquaticus)		A – resident breeding species and winter visitor	LC
Corn crake (Crex crex)		A – breeding summer visitor, formerly abundant, now scarce	LC
Sora rail (Porzana carolina)		A – rare vagrant	LC
Spotted crake (Porzana porzana)		A – scarce breeding summer visitor	LC
Common moorhen (Gallinula chloropus)		A – resident breeding species	LC
Eurasian coot (Fulica atra)		A – resident breeding species and winter visitor	NT
American coot (Fulica americana)		A – rare vagrant	LC
Allen's gallinule (Porphyrio alleni)		A – rare vagrant	LC
American purple gallinule (Porphyrio martinicus)		A – rare vagrant	LC
Western swamphen (Porphyrio porphyrio)		A – rare vagrant; first record 2016	LC
Baillon's crake (Zapornia pusilla)		A – rare vagrant, has bred	LC
Little crake (Zapornia parva)		A – rare vagrant	LC

== Cranes ==
Order: Gruiformes Family: Gruidae

Cranes are large, long-legged and long-necked birds. Unlike the similar-looking but unrelated herons, cranes fly with necks outstretched, not pulled back. Most have elaborate and noisy courting displays or "dances".

Common and binomial names	Image	Status	Conservation status
Sandhill crane (Antigone canadensis)		A – rare vagrant	LC
Common crane (Grus grus)		A – scarce resident breeding species and passage migrant	LC

== Grebes ==
Order: Podicipediformes Family: Podicipedidae

Grebes are small to medium-large diving birds with lobed toes and pointed bills. They are seen mainly on lowland waters and coasts. They feed on aquatic animals and nest on a floating platform of vegetation.

Common and binomial names	Image	Status	Conservation status
Little grebe (Tachybaptus ruficollis)		A – resident breeder and winter visitor	LC
Pied-billed grebe (Podilymbus podiceps)		A – rare vagrant; has hybridised with Little grebe once	LC
Red-necked grebe (Podiceps grisegena)		A – winter visitor; has bred	VU
Great crested grebe (Podiceps cristatus)		A – resident breeder and winter visitor	LC
Horned grebe (Podiceps auritus)		A – scarce resident breeder and winter visitor	NT
Black-necked grebe (Podiceps nigricollis)		A – scarce resident breeder and winter visitor	VU

== Stone-curlews ==
Order: Charadriiformes Family: Burhinidae

A small family of medium to large waders with strong black bills, large yellow eyes and cryptic plumage.

Common and binomial names	Image	Status	Conservation status
Eurasian stone-curlew (Burhinus oedicnemus)		A – scarce breeding summer visitor	LC

== Oystercatchers ==
Order: Charadriiformes Family: Haematopodidae

The oystercatchers are large, obvious and noisy wading birds with strong bills used for smashing or prising open molluscs. There are eleven species worldwide with one in Britain.

Common and binomial names	Image	Status	Conservation status
Eurasian oystercatcher (Haematopus ostralegus)		A – resident breeding species, passage migrant, and winter visitor	NT

== Stilts and avocets ==
Order: Charadriiformes Family: Recurvirostridae

A family of fairly large wading birds. The avocets have long legs and long up-curved bills. The stilts have extremely long legs and long, thin, straight bills. There are ten species worldwide with two in Britain.

Common and binomial names	Image	Status	Conservation status
Black-winged stilt (Himantopus himantopus)		A – scarce migrant and occasional breeder	LC
Pied avocet (Recurvirostra avosetta)		A – resident breeding species	LC

== Plovers and lapwings ==
Order: Charadriiformes Family: Charadriidae

Small to medium-sized wading birds with compact bodies, short, thick necks and long, usually pointed, wings.

Common and binomial names	Image	Status	Conservation status
Grey plover (Pluvialis squatarola)		A – winter visitor and passage migrant	LC
European golden plover (Pluvialis apricaria)		A – breeding resident, passage migrant, and winter visitor	LC
Pacific golden plover (Pluvialis fulva)		A – rare vagrant	LC
American golden plover (Pluvialis dominica)		A – scarce migrant	LC
Eurasian dotterel (Eudromias morinellus)		A – passage migrant and breeding summer visitor	LC
Killdeer (Charadrius vociferus)		A – rare vagrant	NT
Common ringed plover (Charadrius hiaticula)		A – resident breeding species and passage and winter visitor	LC
Semipalmated plover (Charadrius semipalmatus)		A – rare vagrant	LC
Little ringed plover (Thinornis dubius)		A – breeding summer visitor	LC
Northern lapwing (Vanellus vanellus)		A – resident breeding species, passage migrant, and winter visitor	VU
Grey-headed lapwing (Vanellus cinereus)		A – rare vagrant; first recorded May 2023	LC
Sociable lapwing (Vanellus gregarius)		A – rare vagrant	CR
White-tailed lapwing (Vanellus leucurus)		A – rare vagrant	LC
Caspian plover (Anarhynchus asiaticus)		A – rare vagrant	EN
Tibetan sand plover (Anarhynchus atrifrons)		A – rare vagrant	LC
Siberian sand plover (Anarhynchus mongolus)		A – rare vagrant	EN
Greater sand plover (Anarhynchus leschenaultii)		A – rare vagrant	NT
Kentish plover (Anarhynchus alexandrinus)		A – former breeder, now rare vagrant	LC

== Sandpipers and allies ==
Order: Charadriiformes Family: Scolopacidae

A large, diverse family of wading birds. Different lengths of legs and bills enable multiple species to feed in the same habitat, particularly on the coast, without direct competition for food.

Common and binomial names	Image	Status	Conservation status
Upland sandpiper (Bartramia longicauda)		A – rare vagrant	LC
Eurasian whimbrel (Numenius phaeopus)		A – passage migrant and scarce breeding summer visitor in far north	LC
Hudsonian whimbrel (Numenius hudsonicus)		A – rare vagrant	
Little whimbrel (Numenius minutus)		A – rare vagrant	LC
Eskimo curlew (Numenius borealis)		B – extinct	CR
Eurasian curlew (Numenius arquata)		A – resident breeding species	NT
Bar-tailed godwit (Limosa lapponica)		A – winter visitor and passage migrant	LC
Black-tailed godwit (Limosa limosa)		A – winter visitor, passage migrant and scarce summer breeding species	NT
Hudsonian godwit (Limosa haemastica)		A – rare vagrant	VU
Ruddy turnstone (Arenaria interpres)		A – winter visitor and passage migrant	LC
Great knot (Calidris tenuirostris)		A – rare vagrant	EN
Red knot (Calidris canutus)		A – winter visitor and passage migrant	LC
Ruff (Calidris pugnax)		A – passage migrant and winter visitor, also a former scarce breeding resident	NT
Broad-billed sandpiper (Calidris falcinellus)		A – rare vagrant	VU
Sharp-tailed sandpiper (Calidris acuminata)		A – rare vagrant	VU
Stilt sandpiper (Calidris himantopus)		A – rare vagrant	NT
Curlew sandpiper (Calidris ferruginea)		A – passage migrant, rarely also wintering	VU
Temminck's stint (Calidris temminckii)		A – scarce passage migrant, occasional breeder	LC
Long-toed stint (Calidris subminuta)		A – rare vagrant	LC
Red-necked stint (Calidris ruficollis)		A – rare vagrant	NT
Sanderling (Calidris alba)		A – winter visitor and passage migrant	LC
Dunlin (Calidris alpina)		A – winter visitor and passage migrant, scarce breeder	LC
Purple sandpiper (Calidris maritima)		A – winter visitor and passage migrant, occasional breeder	LC
Baird's sandpiper (Calidris bairdii)		A – rare vagrant	LC
Little stint (Calidris minuta)		A – passage migrant, rarely also wintering	LC
Least sandpiper (Calidris minutilla)		A – rare vagrant	NT
White-rumped sandpiper (Calidris fuscicollis)		A – scarce passage migrant	VU
Buff-breasted sandpiper (Calidris subruficollis)		A – scarce passage migrant	VU
Pectoral sandpiper (Calidris melanotos)		A – scarce passage migrant	LC
Semipalmated sandpiper (Calidris pusilla)		A – rare vagrant	NT
Western sandpiper (Calidris mauri)		A – rare vagrant	LC
Long-billed dowitcher (Limnodromus scolopaceus)		A – rare vagrant	NT
Short-billed dowitcher (Limnodromus griseus)		A – rare vagrant	VU
Eurasian woodcock (Scolopax rusticola)		A – resident breeding species	LC
Jack snipe (Lymnocryptes minimus)		A – winter visitor and passage migrant	LC
Great snipe (Gallinago media)		A – rare vagrant	LC
Common snipe (Gallinago gallinago)		A – resident breeding species and winter visitor	VU
Wilson's snipe (Gallinago delicata)		A – rare vagrant	LC
Terek sandpiper (Xenus cinereus)		A – rare vagrant	LC
Wilson's phalarope (Phalaropus tricolor)		A – rare vagrant	LC
Red-necked phalarope (Phalaropus lobatus)		A – winter visitor: scarce and localised summer breeding in far North	LC
Grey phalarope (Phalaropus fulicaria)		A – scarce winter visitor	LC
Common sandpiper (Actitis hypoleucos)		A – resident breeding species and passage migrant	LC
Spotted sandpiper (Actitis macularius)		A – rare vagrant	LC
Green sandpiper (Tringa ochropus)		A – winter visitor and passage migrant, occasional breeder	LC
Solitary sandpiper (Tringa solitaria)		A – rare vagrant	LC
Grey-tailed tattler (Tringa brevipes)		A – rare vagrant	LC
Lesser yellowlegs (Tringa flavipes)		A – scarce migrant, formerly a rare vagrant	VU
Common redshank (Tringa totanus)		A – resident breeding species	VU
Marsh sandpiper (Tringa stagnatilis)		A – rare vagrant	LC
Wood sandpiper (Tringa glareola)		A – passage migrant and rare localised breeder in far North	LC
Spotted redshank (Tringa erythropus)		A – winter visitor and passage migrant	LC
Common greenshank (Tringa nebularia)		A – resident breeding species and passage migrant	LC
Greater yellowlegs (Tringa melanoleuca)		A – rare vagrant	NT

== Pratincoles and coursers ==
Order: Charadriiformes Family: Glareolidae

A family of slender, long-winged wading birds.

Common and binomial names	Image	Status	Conservation status
Cream-coloured courser (Cursorius cursor)		A – rare vagrant	NT
Collared pratincole (Glareola pratincola)		A – rare vagrant	LC
Oriental pratincole (Glareola maldivarum)		A – rare vagrant	LC
Black-winged pratincole (Glareola nordmanni)		A – rare vagrant	LC

== Gulls, terns, and skimmers ==
Order: Charadriiformes Family: Laridae

Medium to large seabirds with grey, white and black plumage, webbed feet and strong bills. Many are opportunistic and adaptable feeders.

Common and binomial names	Image	Status	Conservation status
Black-legged kittiwake (Rissa tridactyla)		A – breeding summer visitor and resident species	VU
Ivory gull (Pagophila eburnea)		A – rare vagrant	VU
Sabine's gull (Xema sabini)		A – scarce winter visitor	LC
Slender-billed gull (Chroicocephalus genei)		A – rare vagrant	VU
Bonaparte's gull (Chroicocephalus philadelphia)		A – rare vagrant	LC
Black-headed gull (Chroicocephalus ridibundus)		A – resident breeding species	LC
Little gull (Hydrocoloeus minutus)		A – winter visitor, occasional breeder	LC
Ross's gull (Rhodostethia rosea)		A – rare vagrant	EN
Laughing gull (Leucophaeus atricilla)		A – rare vagrant	LC
Franklin's gull (Leucophaeus pipixcan)		A – rare vagrant	LC
Audouin's gull (Ichthyaetus audouinii)		A – rare vagrant	VU
Mediterranean gull (Ichthyaetus melanocephalus)		A – breeding summer visitor, and resident in south.	LC
Great black-headed gull (Ichthyaetus ichthyaetus)		B – rare vagrant (one record, 1859)	LC
Common gull (Larus canus)		A – resident breeding species, winter visitor and passage migrant	LC
Ring-billed gull (Larus delawarensis)		A – scarce winter visitor and passage migrant	LC
Great black-backed gull (Larus marinus)		A – resident breeding species and passage migrant	LC
Kelp gull (Larus dominicanus)		A – rare vagrant; first recorded 2022	LC
Glaucous-winged gull (Larus glaucescens)		A – rare vagrant	LC
Glaucous gull (Larus hyperboreus)		A – winter visitor; has bred	LC
Iceland gull (Larus glaucoides)		A – scarce winter visitor	LC
European herring gull (Larus argentatus)		A – resident breeding species	LC
American herring gull (Larus smithsonianus)		A – rare vagrant	LC
Caspian gull (Larus cachinnans)		A – scarce migrant	LC
Yellow-legged gull (Larus michahellis)		A – scarce visitor and passage migrant; has bred	LC
Slaty-backed gull (Larus schistisagus)		A – rare vagrant	LC
Lesser black-backed gull (Larus fuscus)		A – resident breeding species and passage migrant	LC
Gull-billed tern (Gelochelidon nilotica)		A – rare vagrant; has bred	LC
Caspian tern (Hydroprogne caspia)		A – rare vagrant	LC
Royal tern (Thalasseus maximus)		A – rare vagrant	LC
Lesser crested tern (Thalasseus bengalensis)		A – rare vagrant	LC
Sandwich tern (Thalasseus sandvicensis)		A – breeding summer visitor	LC
Cabot's tern (Thalasseus acuflavida)		A – rare vagrant	
Elegant tern (Thalasseus elegans)		A – rare vagrant	NT
Little tern (Sternula albifrons)		A – breeding summer visitor	LC
Least tern (Sternula antillarum)		A – rare vagrant	LC
Aleutian tern (Onychoprion aleutica)		A – rare vagrant	VU
Bridled tern (Onychoprion anaethetus)		A – rare vagrant	LC
Sooty tern (Onychoprion fuscata)		A – rare vagrant	VU
Roseate tern (Sterna dougallii)		A – scarce breeding summer visitor	LC
Common tern (Sterna hirundo)		A – breeding summer visitor	LC
Arctic tern (Sterna paradisaea)		A – breeding summer visitor	LC
Forster's tern (Sterna forsteri)		A – rare vagrant	LC
Whiskered tern (Chlidonias hybridus)		A – rare vagrant	LC
White-winged black tern (Chlidonias leucopterus)		A – scarce migrant	LC
Black tern (Chlidonias niger)		A – passage migrant, occasional breeder	LC

== Skuas ==
Order: Charadriiformes Family: Stercorariidae

Medium to large seabirds with mainly grey or brown plumage, sharp claws and a hooked tip to the bill. They chase other seabirds to force them to drop their catches.

Common and binomial names	Image	Status	Conservation status
South polar skua (Stercorarius maccormicki)		A – rare vagrant	LC
Great skua (Stercorarius skua)		A – passage migrant and localised summer breeder	LC
Pomarine skua (Stercorarius pomarinus)		A – passage migrant	LC
Arctic skua (Stercorarius parasiticus)		A – passage migrant and localised summer breeder	EN
Long-tailed skua (Stercorarius longicaudus)		A – passage migrant	LC

== Auks, murres, and puffins ==
Order: Charadriiformes Family: Alcidae

A family of seabirds which are superficially similar to penguins, with their black-and-white colours, upright posture and some of their habits, but which are able to fly.

Common and binomial names	Image	Status	Conservation status
Little auk (Alle alle)		A – rare winter visitor	LC
Thick-billed murre (Uria lomvia)		A – rare vagrant	LC
Common murre (Uria aalge)		A – breeding summer visitor and resident species	LC
Razorbill (Alca torda)		A – breeding summer visitor and resident species	LC
Great auk (Pinguinus impennis)		B – extinct	EX
Black guillemot (Cepphus grylle)		A – resident localised breeding species	LC
Long-billed murrelet (Brachyramphus perdix)		A – rare vagrant	NT
Ancient murrelet (Synthliboramphus antiquus)		A – rare vagrant	LC
Atlantic puffin (Fratercula arctica)		A – breeding summer visitor	EN
Tufted puffin (Fratercula cirrhata)		A – rare vagrant	LC

== Tropicbirds ==
Order: Phaethontiformes Family: Phaethontidae

Tropicbirds are slender white birds of tropical oceans, with exceptionally long central tail feathers. Their heads and long wings have black markings.

Common and binomial names	Image	Status	Conservation status
Red-billed tropicbird (Phaethon aethereus)		A – rare vagrant	LC

== Divers ==
Order: Gaviiformes Family: Gaviidae

Divers are aquatic birds the size of a large duck, to which they are unrelated. They swim well and fly adequately but are almost helpless on land, because their legs are placed towards the rear of the body. They feed on fish and other aquatic animals.

Common and binomial names	Image	Status	Conservation status
Red-throated diver (Gavia stellata)		A – resident breeder and winter visitor	LC
Black-throated diver (Gavia arctica)		A – resident breeder and winter visitor	LC
Pacific diver (Gavia pacifica)		A – rare vagrant	LC
Great northern diver (Gavia immer)		A – winter visitor; has bred	LC
White-billed diver (Gavia adamsii)		A – rare vagrant	VU

== Southern storm petrels ==
Order: Procellariiformes Family: Oceanitidae

The southern storm petrels are the smallest seabirds, feeding on plankton and small fish picked from the surface, typically while hovering. They nest in colonies on the ground, most often in burrows.

Common and binomial names	Image	Status	Conservation status
Wilson's storm petrel (Oceanites oceanicus)		A – rare vagrant, more regularly seen well offshore	LC
White-faced storm petrel (Pelagodroma marina)		A – rare vagrant	EN

== Albatrosses ==
Order: Procellariiformes Family: Diomedeidae

The albatrosses are among the largest flying birds, with long, narrow wings for gliding. The majority are found in the Southern Hemisphere with only vagrants occurring in the North Atlantic.

Common and binomial names	Image	Status	Conservation status
Black-browed albatross (Thalassarche melanophris)		A – rare vagrant	LC
Atlantic yellow-nosed albatross (Thalassarche chlororhynchos)		A – rare vagrant	EN

== Northern storm petrels ==
Order: Procellariiformes Family: Hydrobatidae

The northern storm-petrels are the smallest seabirds, feeding on plankton and small fish picked from the surface, typically while hovering. They nest in colonies on the ground, most often in burrows.

Common and binomial names	Image	Status	Conservation status
European storm petrel (Hydrobates pelagicus)		A – breeding summer visitor	LC
Swinhoe's petrel (Hydrobates monorhis)		A – rare vagrant	NT
Leach's petrel (Hydrobates leucorhous)		A – breeding summer visitor	VU
Madeiran petrel (Hydrobates castro)		A – rare vagrant; first recorded 2021, with a geotagged bird from a Tenerife breeding colony entering UK waters about 285 km southwest of Bishop Rock, Isles of Scilly	LC

== Shearwaters and petrels ==
Order: Procellariiformes Family: Procellariidae

These are highly pelagic birds with long, narrow wings and tube-shaped nostrils. They feed at sea on fish, squid and other marine life. They come to land to breed in colonies, nesting in burrows or on cliffs.

Common and binomial names	Image	Status	Conservation status
Northern fulmar (Fulmarus glacialis)		A – resident and migrant breeder, passage migrant	VU
Soft-plumaged petrel (Pterodroma mollis)		A – rare vagrant; first recorded 2021	LC
Zino's petrel (Pterodroma madeira)		A – rare vagrant; first recorded 2020	EN
Black-capped petrel (Pterodroma hasitata)		B – rare vagrant	EN
White-chinned petrel (Procellaria aequinoctialis)		A – rare vagrant; first recorded 2020	VU
Scopoli's shearwater (Calonectris diomedea)		A – rare vagrant	LC
Cory's shearwater (Calonectris borealis)		A – scarce migrant	LC
Sooty shearwater (Ardenna grisea)		A – passage migrant	NT
Great shearwater (Ardenna gravis)		A – passage migrant	LC
Manx shearwater (Puffinus puffinus)		A – breeding summer visitor	LC
Yelkouan shearwater (Puffinus yelkouan)		A – rare vagrant	VU
Balearic shearwater (Puffinus mauretanicus)		A – passage migrant	CR
Barolo shearwater (Puffinus baroli)		A – rare vagrant	

== Storks ==
Order: Ciconiiformes Family: Ciconiidae

Storks are large, heavy, long-legged, long-necked wading birds with long stout bills and wide wingspans. They fly with the neck extended.

Common and binomial names	Image	Status	Conservation status
Black stork (Ciconia nigra)		A – rare vagrant	LC
White stork (Ciconia ciconia)		A – scarce migrant, formerly bred. Birds from a reintroduced population bred at Knepp Wildland in 2020.	LC

== Frigatebirds ==
Order: Suliformes Family: Fregatidae

Frigatebirds are large seabirds usually found over tropical oceans. They are large, black-and-white, or completely black, with long wings and deeply forked tails. The males have red inflatable throat pouches. They do not swim or walk and cannot take off from a flat surface. Having the largest wingspan-to-body-weight ratio of any bird, they are essentially aerial, able to stay aloft for more than a week.

Common and binomial names	Image	Status	Conservation status
Ascension frigatebird (Fregata aquila)		A – rare vagrant	VU
Magnificent frigatebird (Fregata magnificens)		A – rare vagrant	LC

== Boobies and gannets ==
Order: Suliformes Family: Sulidae

Gannets are large seabirds that plunge-dive for fish and nest in large colonies. They have a torpedo-shaped body, long, narrow, pointed wings and a fairly long tail. There are ten species worldwide with three in Britain.

Common and binomial names	Image	Status	Conservation status
Northern gannet (Morus bassanus)		A – breeding summer visitor and passage migrant	LC
Red-footed booby (Sula sula)		A – rare vagrant	LC
Brown booby (Sula leucogaster)		A – rare vagrant; first recorded 2019	LC

== Cormorants and shag ==
Order: Suliformes Family: Phalacrocoracidae

Cormorants are medium to large aquatic birds with mainly dark plumage and areas of coloured skin on the face. The bill is long, thin and sharply hooked for catching fish and aquatic invertebrates. They nest in colonies by water, usually by the sea or on the banks of rivers.

Common and binomial names	Image	Status	Conservation status
Great cormorant (Phalacrocorax carbo)		A – resident breeding species	LC
European shag (Gulosus aristotelis)		A – resident breeding species	LC
Double-crested cormorant (Nannopterum auritum)		A – rare vagrant	LC

== Ibises and spoonbills ==
Order: Pelecaniformes Family: Threskiornithidae

A family of long-legged, long-necked wading birds. Ibises have long, curved bills. Spoonbills have a flattened bill, wider at the tip.

Common and binomial names	Image	Status	Conservation status
Glossy ibis (Plegadis falcinellus)		A – scarce migrant, formerly a rare vagrant; has bred	LC
Eurasian spoonbill (Platalea leucorodia)		A – scarce migrant, recently bred	LC

== Bitterns, herons and egrets ==
Order: Pelecaniformes Family: Ardeidae

Herons and egrets are medium to large wading birds with long necks and legs. Bitterns tend to be shorter-necked and more secretive. They all fly with their necks retracted. The sharp bill is used to catch fish, amphibians and other animals. Many species nest in colonies, often in trees. There are 64 species worldwide and 15 in Britain.

Common and binomial names	Image	Status	Conservation status
Eurasian bittern (Botaurus stellaris)		A – resident breeding species and winter migrant	LC
American bittern (Botaurus lentiginosus)		A – rare vagrant	LC
Least bittern (Botaurus exilis)		A – rare vagrant; first recorded 2022	LC
Little bittern (Botaurus minutus)		A – scarce migrant, recently bred	LC
Black-crowned night-heron (Nycticorax nycticorax)		A – scarce migrant, has bred	LC
Green heron (Butorides virescens)		A – rare vagrant	LC
Squacco heron (Ardeola ralloides)		A – rare vagrant	LC
Chinese pond heron (Ardeola bacchus)		A – rare vagrant	LC
Western cattle egret (Ardea ibis)		A – scarce but increasing breeding resident	LC
Grey heron (Ardea cinerea)		A – resident breeding species and winter migrant	LC
Great blue heron (Ardea herodias)		A – rare vagrant	LC
Purple heron (Ardea purpurea)		A – scarce migrant, recently bred	LC
Great white egret (Ardea alba)		A – resident breeding species, first bred 2012	LC
Snowy egret (Egretta thula)		A – rare vagrant	LC
Little egret (Egretta garzetta)		A – resident breeding species and passage migrant	LC

== Pelicans ==
Order: Pelecaniformes Family: Pelecanidae

Pelicans are large water birds with a distinctive pouch under their beak. As with other members of the order Pelecaniformes, they have webbed feet with four toes.

Common and binomial names	Image	Status	Conservation status
Dalmatian pelican (Pelecanus crispus)		A – very rare migrant	LC

== Osprey ==
Order: Accipitriformes Family: Pandionidae

A large fish-eating bird of prey belonging to a family of its own. It is mainly brown above and white below with long, angled wings.

Common and binomial names	Image	Status	Conservation status
Osprey (Pandion haliaetus)		A – breeding summer visitor	LC

== Hawks, eagles, and kites ==
Order: Accipitriformes Family: Accipitridae

A family of birds of prey which includes hawks, buzzards, eagles, kites and harriers. These birds have very large powerful hooked beaks for tearing flesh from their prey, strong legs, powerful talons and keen eyesight.

Common and binomial names	Image	Status	Conservation status
Black-winged Kite (Elanus caeruleus)		A – rare vagrant; first recorded April 2023	LC
Egyptian vulture (Neophron percnopterus)		A – rare vagrant	VU
European honey-buzzard (Pernis apivorus)		A – breeding summer visitor and passage migrant	LC
Short-toed eagle (Circaetus gallicus)		A – rare vagrant	LC
Greater spotted eagle (Clanga clanga)		B – rare vagrant; last record 1915	VU
Booted eagle (Hieraaetus pennatus)		A – rare vagrant	LC
Golden eagle (Aquila chrysaetos)		A – resident breeding species	LC
Eurasian sparrowhawk (Accipiter nisus)		A – resident breeder and passage migrant	LC
Eurasian goshawk (Accipiter gentilis)		A & C – resident breeder and naturalised escapes	LC
Western marsh harrier (Circus aeruginosus)		A – resident breeder and passage migrant	LC
Hen harrier (Circus cyaneus)		A – resident breeder, winter visitor and passage migrant	LC
Northern harrier (Circus hudsonius)		A – rare vagrant	LC
Pallid harrier (Circus macrourus)		A – rare vagrant	LC
Montagu's harrier (Circus pygargus)		A – breeding summer visitor and passage migrant	LC
Red kite (Milvus milvus)		A & C – resident breeder and widespread introductions	LC
Black kite (Milvus migrans)		A – scarce migrant	LC
White-tailed eagle (Haliaeetus albicilla)		A & C – resident breeder; reintroduction projects underway and ongoing	LC
Rough-legged buzzard (Buteo lagopus)		A – winter visitor	LC
Common buzzard (Buteo buteo)		A – resident breeder and passage migrant	LC
Long-legged Buzzard (Buteo rufinus)		A – rare vagrant	LC

== Barn owls ==
Order: Strigiformes Family: Tytonidae

Barn owls are medium to large owls with large heads and characteristic heart-shaped faces. They have long strong legs with powerful talons.

Common and binomial names	Image	Status	Conservation status
Western barn owl (Tyto alba)		A – resident breeding species	LC

== Owls ==
Order: Strigiformes Family: Strigidae

Typical owls are small to large solitary nocturnal birds of prey. They have large forward-facing eyes and ears, a hawk-like beak and a conspicuous circle of feathers around each eye called a facial disc.

Common and binomial names	Image	Status	Conservation status
Tengmalm's owl (Aegolius funereus)		A – rare vagrant	LC
Little owl (Athene noctua)		C – resident introduced population	LC
Northern hawk owl (Surnia ulula)		A – rare vagrant	LC
Eurasian scops owl (Otus scops)		A – rare vagrant	LC
Long-eared owl (Asio otus)		A – scarce resident breeding species	LC
Short-eared owl (Asio flammeus)		A – resident breeding species or winter visitor	LC
Snowy owl (Bubo scandiacus)		A – rare vagrant; has bred Shetland Islands	LC
Tawny owl (Strix aluco)		A – resident breeding species	LC

== Hoopoe ==
Order: Bucerotiformes Family: Upupidae

A small family with a long curved bills, crests and black-and-white striped wings and tails.

Common and binomial names	Image	Status	Conservation status
Eurasian hoopoe (Upupa epops)		A – scarce summer visitor, occasional breeder	LC

== Rollers ==
Order: Coraciiformes Family: Coraciidae

A small family of colourful, medium-sized birds with a crow-like shape that feed mainly on insects.

Common and binomial names	Image	Status	Conservation status
European roller (Coracias garrulus)		A – rare vagrant	LC

== Kingfishers ==
Order: Coraciiformes Family: Alcedinidae

Kingfishers are medium-sized birds with large heads, long pointed bills, short legs and stubby tails.

Common and binomial names	Image	Status	Conservation status
Common kingfisher (Alcedo atthis)		A – resident breeding species	LC
Belted kingfisher (Megaceryle alcyon)		A – rare vagrant	LC

== Bee-eaters ==
Order: Coraciiformes Family: Meropidae

A group of near-passerine birds characterised by richly coloured plumage, slender bodies and usually elongated central tail-feathers.

Common and binomial names	Image	Status	Conservation status
Blue-cheeked bee-eater (Merops persicus)		A – rare vagrant	LC
European bee-eater (Merops apiaster)		A – scarce summer visitor; occasional breeder	LC

== Woodpeckers ==
Order: Piciformes Family: Picidae

Woodpeckers are small to medium-sized birds with chisel-like beaks, short legs, stiff tails and long tongues used for capturing insects. Many woodpeckers have the habit of tapping noisily on tree trunks with their beaks.

Common and binomial names	Image	Status	Conservation status
Eurasian wryneck (Jynx torquilla)		A – rare passage migrant; occasional breeder	LC
Yellow-bellied sapsucker (Sphyrapicus varius)		A – rare vagrant	LC
Lesser spotted woodpecker (Dryobates minor)		A – resident breeding species	LC
Great spotted woodpecker (Dendrocopos major)		A – resident breeding species	LC
European green woodpecker (Picus viridis)		A – resident breeding species	LC

== Falcons and caracaras ==
Order: Falconiformes Family: Falconidae

A family of small to medium-sized, diurnal birds of prey with pointed wings. They do not build their own nests and mainly catch prey in the air.

Common and binomial names	Image	Status	Conservation status
Lesser kestrel (Falco naumanni)		A – rare vagrant	LC
Common kestrel (Falco tinnunculus)		A – resident breeding species	LC
American kestrel (Falco sparverius)		A – rare vagrant	LC
Red-footed falcon (Falco vespertinus)		A – scarce migrant	VU
Amur falcon (Falco amurensis)		A – rare vagrant	LC
Eleonora's falcon (Falco eleonorae)		A – rare vagrant	LC
Merlin (Falco columbarius)		A – resident breeding species	VU
Eurasian hobby (Falco subbuteo)		A – breeding summer visitor	LC
Gyrfalcon (Falco rusticolus)		A – rare vagrant	LC
Peregrine falcon (Falco peregrinus)		A – resident breeding species	LC

== Parrots ==
Order: Psittaciformes Family: Psittaculidae

Parrots are small to large birds with a characteristic curved beak shape. They are found mainly in areas with warm climates.

Common and binomial names	Image	Status	Conservation status
Ring-necked parakeet (Psittacula krameri)		C – resident introduced population	LC

== Tyrant flycatchers ==
Order: Passeriformes Family: Tyrannidae

A large family from the Americas.

Common and binomial names	Image	Status	Conservation status
Eastern phoebe (Sayornis phoebe)		A – rare vagrant	LC
Yellow-bellied flycatcher (Empidonax flaviventris)		A – rare vagrant; first recorded 2020	LC
Acadian flycatcher (Empidonax virescens)		A – rare vagrant	LC
Alder flycatcher (Empidonax alnorum)		A – rare vagrant	LC
Eastern kingbird (Tyrannus tyrannus)		A – rare vagrant	LC

== Shrikes ==
Order: Passeriformes Family: Laniidae

Shrikes are passerine birds known for their habit of catching other birds and small animals and impaling the uneaten portions of their bodies on thorns. A typical shrike's beak is hooked, like a bird of prey.

Common and binomial names	Image	Status	Conservation status
Brown shrike (Lanius cristatus)		A – rare vagrant	LC
Red-backed shrike (Lanius collurio)		A – scarce passage migrant, occasional breeder	LC
Daurian shrike (Lanius isabellinus)		A – rare vagrant	LC
Turkestan shrike (Lanius phoenicuroides)		A – rare vagrant	LC
Long-tailed shrike (Lanius schach)		A – rare vagrant	LC
Lesser grey shrike (Lanius minor)		A – rare vagrant	LC
Great grey shrike (Lanius excubitor)		A – scarce winter visitor	LC
Woodchat shrike (Lanius senator)		A – scarce migrant	NT
Masked shrike (Lanius nubicus)		A – rare vagrant	LC

== Vireos ==
Order: Passeriformes Family: Vireonidae

The vireos are a group of small to medium-sized passerine birds restricted to the New World.

Common and binomial names	Image	Status	Conservation status
Yellow-throated vireo (Vireo flavifrons)		A – rare vagrant	LC
Philadelphia vireo (Vireo philadelphicus)		A – rare vagrant	LC
Red-eyed vireo (Vireo olivaceus)		A – rare vagrant	LC

== Old World orioles ==
Order: Passeriformes Family: Oriolidae

The orioles are medium-sized passerines, mostly with bright and showy plumage, the females often have duller plumage than the males The beak is long, slightly curved and hooked. Orioles are arboreal and tend to feed in the canopy. There are 36 species worldwide, one of which has been recorded in Great Britain.

Common and binomial names	Image	Status	Conservation status
Eurasian golden oriole (Oriolus oriolus)		A – scarce breeding summer visitor	LC

== Crows, jays, and magpies ==
Order: Passeriformes Family: Corvidae

The crows and their relatives are fairly large birds with strong bills and are usually intelligent and adaptable.

Common and binomial names	Image	Status	Conservation status
Eurasian jay (Garrulus glandarius)		A – resident breeding species	LC
Eurasian magpie (Pica pica)		A – resident breeding species	LC
Northern nutcracker (Nucifraga caryocatactes)		A – rare vagrant	LC
Red-billed chough (Pyrrhocorax pyrrhocorax)		A – resident breeding species	LC
Western jackdaw (Coloeus monedula)		A – resident breeding species	LC
Rook (Corvus frugilegus)		A – resident breeding species	VU
Carrion crow (Corvus corone)		A – resident breeding species	LC
Hooded crow (Corvus cornix)		A – resident breeding species	
Common raven (Corvus corax)		A – resident breeding species	LC

== Waxwings ==
Order: Passeriformes Family: Bombycillidae

The waxwings are a group of passerine birds characterised by soft, silky plumage and unique red tips to some of the wing feathers.

Common and binomial names	Image	Status	Conservation status
Bohemian waxwing (Bombycilla garrulus)		A – winter visitor in highly variable numbers	LC
Cedar waxwing (Bombycilla cedrorum)		A – rare vagrant	LC

== Tits, chickadees, and titmice ==
Order: Passeriformes Family: Paridae

Tits are mainly small, stocky, woodland species with short stout bills. They are adaptable birds, with a mixed diet including seeds and insects.

Common and binomial names	Image	Status	Conservation status
Coal tit (Periparus ater)		A – resident breeding species	LC
Crested tit (Lophophanes cristatus)		A – resident breeding species	LC
Marsh tit (Poecile palustris)		A – resident breeding species	LC
Willow tit (Poecile montana)		A – resident breeding species	LC
Eurasian blue tit (Cyanistes caeruleus)		A – resident breeding species	LC
Great tit (Parus major)		A – resident breeding species	LC

== Penduline tits ==
Order: Passeriformes Family: Remizidae

Small birds with finely pointed bills that build purse-like nests hanging from a branch.

Common and binomial names	Image	Status	Conservation status
Eurasian penduline tit (Remiz pendulinus)		A – rare vagrant	LC

== Bearded tit ==
Order: Passeriformes Family: Panuridae

A single species formerly placed in the family Sylviidae.

Common and binomial names	Image	Status	Conservation status
Bearded reedling (Panurus biarmicus)		A – resident breeding species	LC

== Larks ==
Order: Passeriformes Family: Alaudidae

Larks are small terrestrial birds with often extravagant songs and display flights. Most larks are fairly dull in appearance. Their food is insects and seeds.

Common and binomial names	Image	Status	Conservation status
Woodlark (Lullula arborea)		A – scarce resident breeding species and summer migrant	LC
White-winged lark (Alauda leucoptera)		A – rare vagrant	LC
Eurasian skylark (Alauda arvensis)		A – resident breeding species	LC
Crested lark (Galerida cristata)		A – rare vagrant	LC
Horned lark (Eremophila alpestris)		A – scarce winter visitor and passage migrant, occasional breeder	LC
Greater short-toed lark (Calandrella brachydactyla)		A – scarce migrant	LC
Bimaculated lark (Melanocorypha bimaculata)		A – rare vagrant	LC
Calandra lark (Melanocorypha calandra)		A – rare vagrant	LC
Black lark (Melanocorypha yeltoniensis)		A – rare vagrant	EN

== Swallows ==
Order: Passeriformes Family: Hirundinidae

The family Hirundinidae is adapted to aerial feeding. They have a slender streamlined body, long pointed wings and a short bill with a wide gape.

Common and binomial names	Image	Status	Conservation status
Sand martin (Riparia riparia)		A – breeding summer visitor	LC
Tree swallow (Tachycineta bicolor)		A – rare vagrant	LC
Purple martin (Progne subis)		A – rare vagrant	LC
Crag martin (Ptyonoprogne rupestris)		A – rare vagrant	LC
Barn swallow (Hirundo rustica)		A – breeding summer visitor	LC
Common house martin (Delichon urbicum)		A – breeding summer visitor	LC
Red-rumped swallow (Cecropis daurica)		A – scarce migrant	LC
American cliff swallow (Petrochelidon pyrrhonota)		A – rare vagrant	LC

== Bush warblers ==
Order: Passeriformes Family: Cettiidae

A recently split family formerly placed in the Sylviidae family. There are 32 species worldwide, with one found in Britain.

Common and binomial names	Image	Status	Conservation status
Cetti's warbler (Cettia cetti)		A – recently colonised resident breeding species	LC

== Long-tailed tits ==
Order: Passeriformes Family: Aegithalidae

Small, long-tailed birds that typically live in flocks for much of the year. There are 13 species worldwide with one in Britain.

Common and binomial names	Image	Status	Conservation status
Long-tailed tit (Aegithalos caudatus)		A – resident breeding species	LC

== Leaf warblers ==
Order: Passeriformes Family: Phylloscopidae

A recently split family of small insectivorous birds, formerly included within the Sylviidae. There are 81 species, with 16 in Britain.

Common and binomial names	Image	Status	Conservation status
Wood warbler (Phylloscopus sibilatrix)		A – breeding summer visitor	LC
Western Bonelli's warbler (Phylloscopus bonelli)		A – rare vagrant	LC
Eastern Bonelli's warbler (Phylloscopus orientalis)		A – rare vagrant	LC
Hume's warbler (Phylloscopus humei)		A – rare vagrant	LC
Yellow-browed warbler (Phylloscopus inornatus)		A – scarce migrant	LC
Pallas's warbler (Phylloscopus proregulus)		A – scarce migrant	LC
Radde's warbler (Phylloscopus schwarzi)		A – scarce migrant	LC
Sulphur-bellied warbler (Phylloscopus griseolus)		A – rare vagrant; first reported 2021	LC
Dusky warbler (Phylloscopus fuscatus)		A – scarce migrant	LC
Willow warbler (Phylloscopus trochilus)		A – breeding summer visitor	LC
Common chiffchaff (Phylloscopus collybita)		A – breeding summer visitor and passage and winter visitor	LC
Iberian chiffchaff (Phylloscopus ibericus)		A – rare vagrant, occasional breeder	LC
Eastern crowned warbler (Phylloscopus coronatus)		A – rare vagrant	LC
Green warbler (Phylloscopus nitidus)		A – rare vagrant	LC
Two-barred greenish warbler (Phylloscopus plumbeitarsus)		A – rare vagrant	LC
Greenish warbler (Phylloscopus trochiloides)		A – scarce migrant	LC
Pale-legged leaf warbler (Phylloscopus tenellipes)		A – rare vagrant	LC
Arctic warbler (Phylloscopus borealis)		A – scarce migrant	LC

== Reed warblers ==
Order: Passeriformes Family: Acrocephalidae

A small, insectivorous and vocal group of species, formerly included within the family Sylviidae.

Common and binomial names	Image	Status	Conservation status
Great reed warbler (Acrocephalus arundinaceus)		A – rare vagrant; has bred	LC
Aquatic warbler (Acrocephalus paludicola)		A – formerly a scarce migrant, now a rare vagrant	VU
Sedge warbler (Acrocephalus schoenobaenus)		A – breeding summer visitor	LC
Paddyfield warbler (Acrocephalus agricola)		A – rare vagrant	LC
Blyth's reed warbler (Acrocephalus dumetorum)		A – formerly a rare vagrant, now a scarce migrant	LC
Eurasian reed warbler (Acrocephalus scirpaceus)		A – breeding summer visitor	LC
Marsh warbler (Acrocephalus palustris)		A – breeding summer visitor	LC
Thick-billed warbler (Arundinax aedon)		A – rare vagrant	LC
Booted warbler (Iduna caligata)		A – rare vagrant	LC
Sykes's warbler (Iduna rama)		A – rare vagrant	LC
Eastern olivaceous warbler (Iduna pallida)		A – rare vagrant	LC
Western olivaceous warbler (Iduna opaca)		A – rare vagrant; first recorded in October 2023	LC
Olive-tree warbler (Hippolais olivetorum)		A – rare vagrant	LC
Melodious warbler (Hippolais polyglotta)		A – scarce migrant	LC
Icterine warbler (Hippolais icterina)		A – scarce migrant, occasional breeder	LC

== Grassbirds and allies ==
Order: Passeriformes Family: Locustellidae

A recently split family, previously part of the family Sylviidae.

Common and binomial names	Image	Status	Conservation status
Pallas's grasshopper warbler (Helopsaltes certhiola)		A – rare vagrant	LC
Lanceolated warbler (Locustella lanceolata)		A – rare vagrant	LC
River warbler (Locustella fluviatilis)		A – rare vagrant	LC
Savi's warbler (Locustella luscinioides)		A – rare breeding summer visitor	LC
Grasshopper warbler (Locustella naevia)		A – breeding summer visitor	LC

== Cisticolas and allies ==
Order: Passeriformes Family: Cisticolidae

A group of insectivorous species, previously included within the family Sylviidae.

Common and binomial names	Image	Status	Conservation status
Zitting cisticola (Cisticola juncidis)		A – rare vagrant	LC

== Sylviid warblers, parrotbills, and allies ==
Order: Passeriformes Family: Sylviidae

A group of small insectivorous birds.

Common and binomial names	Image	Status	Conservation status
Eurasian blackcap (Sylvia atricapilla)		A – resident breeding species and summer visitor	LC
Garden warbler (Sylvia borin)		A – breeding summer visitor	LC
Barred warbler (Curruca nisoria)		A – passage migrant	LC
Lesser whitethroat (Curruca curruca)		A – breeding summer visitor	LC
Western Orphean warbler (Curucca hortensis)		A – rare vagrant	LC
Eastern Orphean warbler (Curucca crassirostris)		A – rare vagrant	LC
Asian desert warbler (Curruca nana)		A – rare vagrant	VU
Rüppell's warbler (Curruca ruppeli)		A – rare vagrant	LC
Sardinian warbler (Curruca melanocephala)		A – rare vagrant	LC
Western subalpine warbler (Curruca iberiae)		A – rare vagrant	
Moltoni's subalpine warbler (Curruca subalpina)		A – rare vagrant	LC
Eastern subalpine warbler (Curruca cantillans)		A – rare vagrant	LC
Common whitethroat (Curruca communis)		A – breeding summer visitor	LC
Spectacled warbler (Curruca conspicillata)		A – rare vagrant	LC
Marmora's warbler (Curruca sarda)		A – rare vagrant	LC
Dartford warbler (Curruca undata)		A – resident breeding species	NT

== Kinglets ==
Order: Passeriformes Family: Regulidae

A family of very small birds.

Common and binomial names	Image	Status	Conservation status
Ruby-crowned kinglet (Corthylio calendula)		A – rare vagrant; first recorded 2020	LC
Goldcrest (Regulus regulus)		A – resident breeding species	LC
Common firecrest (Regulus ignicapillus)		A – scarce resident breeding species and passage migrant	LC

== Wrens ==
Order: Passeriformes Family: Troglodytidae

Wrens are small and inconspicuous birds, except for their loud songs. They have short wings and thin down-turned bills.

Common and binomial names	Image	Status	Conservation status
Eurasian wren (Troglodytes troglodytes)		A – resident breeding species	LC

== Nuthatches ==
Order: Passeriformes Family: Sittidae

Nuthatches are small woodland birds with the unusual ability to climb down trees head-first, unlike other birds which can only go upwards.

Common and binomial names	Image	Status	Conservation status
Red-breasted nuthatch (Sitta canadensis)		A – rare vagrant	LC
Eurasian nuthatch (Sitta europaea)		A – resident breeding species	LC

== Wallcreeper ==
Order: Passeriformes Family: Tichodromadidae

One species, in its own family, a rare visitor to Britain.

Common and binomial names	Image	Status	Conservation status
Wallcreeper (Tichodroma muraria)		A – rare vagrant	LC

== Treecreepers ==
Order: Passeriformes Family: Certhiidae

Treecreepers are small woodland birds, brown above and white below. They have thin, pointed, down-curved bills, which they use to extricate insects from bark.

Common and binomial names	Image	Status	Conservation status
Eurasian treecreeper (Certhia familiaris)		A – resident breeding species	LC
Short-toed treecreeper (Certhia brachydactyla)		A – rare vagrant	LC

== Mockingbirds and thrashers ==
Order: Passeriformes Family: Mimidae

Medium-sized passerine birds with long tails. Some are notable for their ability to mimic sounds such as other birds' songs.

Common and binomial names	Image	Status	Conservation status
Grey catbird (Dumetella carolinensis)		A – rare vagrant (two records)	LC
Northern mockingbird (Mimus polyglottos)		A – rare vagrant	LC
Brown thrasher (Toxostoma rufum)		A – rare vagrant (one record)	LC

== Starlings ==
Order: Passeriformes Family: Sturnidae

Starlings are small to medium-sized passerine birds with strong feet. Their flight is strong and direct and most are very gregarious.

Common and binomial names	Image	Status	Conservation status
Rose-coloured starling (Pastor roseus)		A – rare vagrant	LC
Common starling (Sturnus vulgaris)		A – resident breeding species and winter visitor	LC

== Thrushes and allies ==
Order: Passeriformes Family: Turdidae

The thrushes are plump, soft-plumaged, small to medium-sized insectivores or sometimes omnivores, often feeding on the ground. Many have attractive songs.

Common and binomial names	Image	Status	Conservation status
Varied thrush (Ixoreus naevius)		A – very rare vagrant (two records as of 2023)	LC
Wood thrush (Hylocichla mustelina)		A – rare vagrant	LC
Swainson's thrush (Catharus ustulatus)		A – rare vagrant	LC
Hermit thrush (Catharus guttatus)		A – rare vagrant	LC
Grey-cheeked thrush (Catharus minimus)		A – rare vagrant	LC
Veery (Catharus fuscescens)		A – rare vagrant	LC
White's thrush (Zoothera aurea)		A – rare vagrant	LC
Siberian thrush (Geokichla sibirica)		A – rare vagrant	LC
Song thrush (Turdus philomelos)		A – resident breeding species	LC
Mistle thrush (Turdus viscivorus)		A – resident breeding species	LC
Redwing (Turdus iliacus)		A – winter visitor, rare breeder; two subspecies: Turdus iliacus iliacus (nominate; winter visitor, rare breeder); Turdus iliacus coburni (Icelandic; winter visitor)	LC
Common blackbird (Turdus merula)		A – resident breeding species	LC
Eyebrowed thrush (Turdus obscurus)		A – rare vagrant	LC
Fieldfare (Turdus pilaris)		A – winter visitor, rare breeder	LC
Ring ouzel (Turdus torquatus)		A – breeding summer visitor	LC
Black-throated thrush (Turdus atrogularis)		A – rare vagrant	LC
Red-throated thrush (Turdus ruficollis)		A – rare vagrant	LC
Dusky thrush (Turdus eunomus)		A – rare vagrant	LC
Naumann's thrush (Turdus naumanni)		A – rare vagrant	LC
American robin (Turdus migratorius)		A – rare vagrant	LC

== Old World flycatchers ==
Order: Passeriformes Family: Muscicapidae. Subfamily: Muscicapinae

The flycatchers and chats are small, mainly insectivorous birds. The flycatchers fly out from a perch to catch insects in the air.

Common and binomial names	Image	Status	Conservation status
Rufous-tailed scrub robin (Cercotrichas galactotes)		A – rare vagrant	LC
Spotted flycatcher (Muscicapa striata)		A – breeding summer visitor	LC
Asian brown flycatcher (Muscicapa dauurica)		A – rare vagrant	LC
European robin (Erithacus rubecula)		A – resident breeding species	LC
Siberian blue robin (Larvivora cyanea)		A – rare vagrant	LC
Rufous-tailed robin (Larvivora sibilans)		A – rare vagrant	LC
Bluethroat (Luscinia svecica)		A – scarce migrant, occasional breeder; two subspecies: Red-spotted bluethroat Luscinia svecica svecica (scarce migrant, occasional breeder); White-spotteed bluethroat Luscinia svecica cyanecula (scarce migrant)	LC
Thrush nightingale (Luscinia luscinia)		A – rare vagrant	LC
Common nightingale (Luscinia megarhynchos)		A – breeding summer visitor	LC
White-throated robin (Irania gutturalis)		A – rare vagrant	LC
Siberian rubythroat (Calliope calliope)		A – rare vagrant	LC
Red-flanked bluetail (Tarsiger cyanurus)		A – scarce migrant, formerly a rare vagrant	LC
Taiga flycatcher (Ficedula albicilla)		A – rare vagrant	LC
Red-breasted flycatcher (Ficedula parva)		A – scarce migrant	LC
European pied flycatcher (Ficedula hypoleuca)		A – breeding summer visitor	LC
Collared flycatcher (Ficedula albicollis)		A – rare vagrant	LC
Black redstart (Phoenicurus ochruros)		A – scarce breeding resident, passage migrant and winter visitor	LC
Common redstart (Phoenicurus phoenicurus)		A – breeding summer visitor	LC
Moussier's redstart (Phoenicurus moussieri)		A – rare vagrant	LC
Common rock thrush (Monticola saxatilis)		A – rare vagrant	LC
Blue rock thrush (Monticola solitarius)		A – rare vagrant	LC
Whinchat (Saxicola rubetra)		A – breeding summer visitor and passage migrant	LC
European stonechat (Saxicola rubicola)		A – resident breeding species	
Siberian stonechat (Saxicola maurus)		A – rare vagrant	
Stejneger's stonechat (Saxicola stejnegeri)		A – rare vagrant	
Northern wheatear (Oenanthe oenanthe)		A – breeding summer visitor and passage migrant	LC
Isabelline wheatear (Oenanthe isabellina)		A – rare vagrant	LC
Desert wheatear (Oenanthe deserti)		A – rare vagrant	NT
Western black-eared wheatear (Oenanthe hispanica)		A – rare vagrant	LC
Eastern black-eared wheatear (Oenanthe melanoleuca)		A – rare vagrant	
Pied wheatear (Oenanthe pleschanka)		A – rare vagrant	LC
White-crowned black wheatear (Oenanthe leucopyga)		A – rare vagrant	LC

== Dippers ==
Order: Passeriformes Family: Cinclidae

Dark, dumpy, aquatic birds which are able to forage for food on the beds of rivers.

Common and binomial names	Image	Status	Conservation status
White-throated dipper (Cinclus cinclus)		A – resident breeding species	LC

== Old World sparrows ==
Order: Passeriformes Family: Passeridae

Sparrows tend to be small, plump, brownish or greyish birds with short tails and short, powerful beaks. They are seed-eaters and they also consume small insects.

Common and binomial names	Image	Status	Conservation status
Rock sparrow (Petronia petronia)		A – rare vagrant	LC
Eurasian tree sparrow (Passer montanus)		A – resident breeding species	LC
Spanish sparrow (Passer hispaniolensis)		A – rare vagrant	LC
House sparrow (Passer domesticus)		A – resident breeding species	LC

== Accentors ==
Order: Passeriformes Family: Prunellidae

A small family of drab, unobtrusive, insectivorous birds with thin, pointed bills.

Common and binomial names	Image	Status	Conservation status
Alpine accentor (Prunella collaris)		A – rare vagrant	LC
Siberian accentor (Prunella montanella)		A – rare vagrant with multiple records in 2016	LC
Dunnock (Prunella modularis)		A – resident breeding species	LC

== Wagtails and pipits ==
Order: Passeriformes Family: Motacillidae

Motacillidae is a family of small passerine birds with medium to long tails. They are slender, ground-feeding insectivores of open country.

Common and binomial names	Image	Status	Conservation status
Western yellow wagtail (Motacilla flava)		Six subspecies: Yellow wagtail M. f. flavissima (subspecies breeding in Britain); Blue-headed wagtail M. f. flava (nominate subspecies occurring as a migrant and rare breeder); Iberian yellow wagtail M. f. iberiae (rare vagrant); Italian yellow wagtail M. f. cinereocapilla (rare vagrant); Black-headed wagtail M. f. feldegg (rare vagrant); Scandinavian yellow wagtail M. f. thunbergi (scarce migrant)	LC
Eastern yellow wagtail (Motacilla tschutschensis)		A – rare vagrant	LC
Citrine wagtail (Motacilla citreola)		A – scarce migrant, formerly a rare vagrant	LC
Grey wagtail (Motacilla cinerea)		A – resident breeding species	LC
White wagtail (Motacilla alba)		A – resident breeding species with three additional visiting subspecies: M. a. yarrelli, pied wagtail (subspecies breeding in Britain); M. a. alba (nominate subspecies, occurring as a migrant and rare breeder); M. a. personata (rare vagrant); M. a. leucopsis, Amur wagtail (rare vagrant)	LC
Richard's pipit (Anthus richardi)		A – scarce migrant	LC
Blyth's pipit (Anthus godlewskii)		A – rare vagrant	LC
Tawny pipit (Anthus campestris)		A – rare vagrant, formerly a scarce migrant	LC
Meadow pipit (Anthus pratensis)		A – resident breeding species	LC
Tree pipit (Anthus trivialis)		A – breeding summer visitor	LC
Olive-backed pipit (Anthus hodgsoni)		A – rare vagrant	LC
Pechora pipit (Anthus gustavi)		A – rare vagrant	CR
Red-throated pipit (Anthus cervinus)		A – rare vagrant, formerly a scarce migrant	LC
Buff-bellied pipit (Anthus rubescens)		A – rare vagrant	LC
Water pipit (Anthus spinoletta)		A – winter visitor	LC
Eurasian rock pipit (Anthus petrosus)		A – resident breeding species	LC

== Finches, euphonias, and allies ==
Order: Passeriformes Family: Fringillidae

Seed-eating passerine birds that are small to moderately large and have a strong beak, usually conical and in some species very large.

Common and binomial names	Image	Status	Conservation status
Common chaffinch (Fringilla coelebs)		A – resident breeding species	LC
Brambling (Fringilla montifringilla)		A – winter visitor, occasional breeder	LC
Evening grosbeak (Hesperiphona vespertina)		A – rare vagrant	VU
Hawfinch (Coccothraustes coccothraustes)		A – scarce resident breeding species	LC
Pine grosbeak (Pinicola enucleator)		A – rare vagrant	LC
Eurasian bullfinch (Pyrrhula pyrrhula)		A – resident breeding species	LC
Trumpeter finch (Bucanetes githagineus)		A – rare vagrant	LC
Common rosefinch (Carpodacus erythrinus)		A – scarce migrant, occasional breeder	LC
European greenfinch (Chloris chloris)		A – resident breeding species	LC
Twite (Linaria flavirostris)		A – resident breeding species	LC
Eurasian linnet (Linaria cannabina)		A – resident breeding species	LC
Common redpoll (Acanthis flammea)		A – winter visitor and passage migrant, occasional breeder	LC
Lesser redpoll (Acanthis cabaret)		A – resident breeding species	
Arctic redpoll (Acanthis hornemanni)		A – rare vagrant	
Parrot crossbill (Loxia pytyopsittacus)		A – resident breeding species	LC
Scottish crossbill (Loxia scotica)		A – resident endemic breeding species	LC
Common crossbill (Loxia curvirostra)		A – resident breeding species	LC
Two-barred crossbill (Loxia leucoptera)		A – rare vagrant	LC
European goldfinch (Carduelis carduelis)		A – resident breeding species	LC
Citril finch (Carduelis citrinella)		A – rare vagrant	LC
European serin (Serinus serinus)		A – scarce passage migrant, occasional breeder	LC
Eurasian siskin (Spinus spinus)		A – resident breeding species and winter visitor	LC

== Longspurs and arctic buntings ==
Order: Passeriformes Family: Calcariidae

A small family of migratory seed eating birds.

Common and binomial names	Image	Status	Conservation status
Lapland bunting (Calcarius lapponicus)		A – winter visitor, occasional breeder	LC
Snow bunting (Plectrophenax nivalis)		A – winter visitor and scarce breeder	LC

== Old World buntings ==
Order: Passeriformes Family: Emberizidae. A large group of seed-eating passerine birds with a distinctively shaped bill.

Common and binomial names	Image	Status	Conservation status
Corn bunting (Emberiza calandra)		A – resident breeding species	LC
Yellowhammer (Emberiza citrinella)		A – resident breeding species	LC
Pine bunting (Emberiza leucocephalos)		A – rare vagrant	RE
Rock bunting (Emberiza cia)		A – rare vagrant	LC
Ortolan bunting (Emberiza hortulana)		A – scarce migrant	LC
Cretzschmar's bunting (Emberiza caesia)		A – rare vagrant	LC
Cirl bunting (Emberiza cirlus)		A – resident breeding species	LC
Chestnut-eared bunting (Emberiza fucata)		A – rare vagrant	LC
Little bunting (Emberiza pusilla)		A – scarce migrant	LC
Yellow-browed bunting (Emberiza chrysophrys)		A – rare vagrant	LC
Rustic bunting (Emberiza rustica)		A – rare vagrant, formerly a scarce migrant	LC
Yellow-breasted bunting (Emberiza aureola)		A – rare vagrant	CR
Chestnut bunting (Emberiza rutila)		A – rare vagrant	LC
Black-headed bunting (Emberiza melanocephala)		A – rare vagrant	LC
Red-headed bunting (Emberiza bruniceps)		A – rare vagrant	LC
Black-faced bunting (Emberiza spodocephala)		A – rare vagrant	LC
Pallas's reed bunting (Emberiza pallasi)		A – rare vagrant	LC
Reed bunting (Emberiza schoeniclus)		A – resident breeding species	LC

== New World sparrows ==
Order: Passeriformes Family: Passerellidae.

A seed eating group of species, recently split from the family Emberizidae.

Common and binomial names	Image	Status	Conservation status
Lark sparrow (Chondestes grammacus)		A – rare vagrant	LC
Dark-eyed junco (Junco hyemalis)		A – rare vagrant	LC
White-crowned sparrow (Zonotrichia leucophrys)		A – rare vagrant	LC
White-throated sparrow (Zonotrichia albicollis)		A – rare vagrant	LC
Savannah sparrow (Passerculus sandwichensis)		A – rare vagrant	LC
Song sparrow (Melospiza melodia)		A – rare vagrant	LC
Eastern towhee (Pipilo erythrophthalmus)		A – rare vagrant	LC

== Troupials and allies ==
Order: Passeriformes Family: Icteridae.

The icterids are a group of small to medium-sized, often colorful passerine birds restricted to the New World and include the grackles, New World blackbirds, and New World orioles. Most species have black as a predominant plumage color, often enlivened by yellow, orange, or red.

Common and binomial names	Image	Status	Conservation status
Bobolink (Dolichonyx oryzivorus)		A – rare vagrant	NT
Baltimore oriole (Icterus galbula)		A – rare vagrant	LC
Red-winged blackbird (Agelaius phoeniceus)		A – rare vagrant	LC
Brown-headed cowbird (Molothrus ater)		A – rare vagrant	LC

== New World warblers ==
Order: Passeriformes Family: Parulidae

A group of small, often colourful passerine birds restricted to the New World. Most are arboreal and insectivorous.

Common and binomial names	Image	Status	Conservation status
Ovenbird (Seiurus aurocapilla)		A – rare vagrant	LC
Northern waterthrush (Parkesia noveboracensis)		A – rare vagrant	LC
Golden-winged warbler (Vermivora chrysoptera)		A – rare vagrant	NT
Black-and-white warbler (Mniotilta varia)		A – rare vagrant	LC
Tennessee warbler (Leiothlypis peregrina)		A – rare vagrant	LC
Common yellowthroat (Geothlypis trichas)		A – rare vagrant	LC
Hooded warbler (Setophaga citrina)		A – rare vagrant	LC
American redstart (Setophaga ruticilla)		A – rare vagrant	LC
Cape May warbler (Setophaga tigrina)		A – rare vagrant	LC
Northern parula (Setophaga americana)		A – rare vagrant	LC
Magnolia warbler (Setophaga magnolia)		A – rare vagrant	LC
Bay-breasted warbler (Setophaga castanea)		A – rare vagrant	LC
Blackburnian warbler (Setophaga fusca)		A – rare vagrant	LC
Yellow warbler (Setophaga petechia)		A – rare vagrant	LC
Chestnut-sided warbler (Setophaga pensylvanica)		A – rare vagrant	LC
Blackpoll warbler (Setophaga striata)		A – rare vagrant	NT
Yellow-rumped warbler (Setophaga coronata)		A – rare vagrant	LC
Canada warbler (Cardellina canadensis)		A – rare vagrant, one record	LC
Wilson's warbler (Cardellina pusilla)		A – rare vagrant	LC

== Cardinals and allies ==
Order: Passeriformes Family: Cardinalidae

The cardinals are a family of robust, seed-eating birds with strong bills. They are typically associated with open woodland. The sexes usually have distinct plumages.

Common and binomial names	Image	Status	Conservation status
Summer tanager (Piranga rubra)		A – rare vagrant	LC
Scarlet tanager (Piranga olivacea)		A – rare vagrant	LC
Rose-breasted grosbeak (Pheucticus ludovicianus)		A – rare vagrant	LC
Indigo bunting (Passerina cyanea)		A – rare vagrant	LC

The links above lead to family accounts and individual species. Taxonomy is very fluid in the age of DNA analysis, so other arrangements may be found, as in Sibley-Ahlquist taxonomy.

== Species awaiting acceptance ==
The following species have been recorded recently and the British Ornithologists' Union Records Committee has not yet made a decision on whether to accept them onto the British List.

Common and binomial names	Image	Status
Fea's petrel (Pterodroma feae)	Feas petrel	A – rare vagrant, previously accepted onto the British list as Fea's petrel but since split into three distinct species

== See also ==
- List of non-native birds of Great Britain
- List of birds of Leicestershire and Rutland
- List of birds of Wales
- Lists of birds by region
- British Birds Rarities Committee
- British Birds (a long-established ornithology journal).
- European birds
- Eurasian eagle-owl in Great Britain
