= List of introduced bird species =

This list of introduced bird species includes all the species of bird introduced to an area without regard to that territory being or not being their native area of occupation or the success of that re-introduction or introduction to the area. This practice has been harmful in many areas, although some introductions are made with the aim of preserving bird species. Following the name of the bird, a brief description of where they were introduced is included.

== Struthioniformes ==
=== Struthionidae ===
- Ostrich, successfully introduced to Australia, and possibly introduced to Israel

== Casuariiformes ==
=== Casuariidae ===
- Emu, successfully introduced to Kangaroo Island, South Australia, Tasmania and possibly introduced to Texas

== Rheiformes ==
=== Rheidae ===
- Greater rhea, successfully introduced to Germany (by accident)
- Lesser rhea, successfully introduced to Tierra del Fuego

== Apterygiformes ==
=== Apterygidae ===
- Tokoeka, successfully introduced to Kapiti Island and Little Barrier Island, New Zealand
- Little spotted kiwi, successfully introduced to Kapiti Island, New Zealand

== Tinamiformes ==
=== Tinamidae ===
- Chilean tinamou, introduced successfully to Easter Island and unsuccessfully to the Hawaiian Islands
- Great tinamou, unsuccessfully introduced to Sapelo Island, Georgia, US
- Red-winged tinamou, unsuccessfully introduced to the United States

== Anseriformes ==
=== Anatidae ===
- Black-bellied whistling duck, unsuccessfully introduced to Cuba and Jamaica
- White-faced whistling duck, possibly introduced successfully in Costa Rica; unsuccessfully introduced to Mauritius
- Trumpeter swan, re-introduced successfully to areas of the United States and Canada
- Mute swan, introduced successfully to North America, New Zealand, Australia, South Africa, United Arab Emirates and Japan introduced unsuccessfully to the Hawaiian Islands
- Black swan, successfully introduced to the Netherlands, United Arab Emirates and Japan; unsuccessfully introduced to Tahiti and Hawaiian Islands
- Swan goose, a domesticated breed that can become feral, but which has difficulty in becoming established. Feral populations known in Europe possibly unsuccessfully introduced to Hawaii
- Spur-winged goose, unsuccessfully introduced to Western Australia
- Cape Barren goose, introduced unsuccessfully to New Zealand; re-introduced successfully to King Island in Bass Strait
- Snow goose, unsuccessfully introduced to New Zealand
- Emperor goose, successfully introduced to England
- Bar-headed goose, successfully to Canada and much of Europe
- Greylag goose, successfully reintroduced to England (remained present as native in northern Scotland); successfully introduced the Falkland Islands and New Zealand. Possibly successfully introduced ferally in Colombia and elsewhere in the Andes
- Canada goose, successfully introduced to Great Britain, Ireland, Sweden, Denmark, Japan, and New Zealand; successfully re-introduced to some areas of the United States and Canada; unsuccessfully introduced to the Hawaiian Islands and Western Australia
- Barnacle goose, successfully introduced to southern England
- Hawaiian goose, re-introduced successfully to Hawaii and Maui in the Hawaiian Islands; possibly introduced unsuccessfully to New Zealand
- Magellan goose, unsuccessfully introduced to South Georgia Island
- Australian wood duck, possibly introduced unsuccessfully to the Hawaiian Islands and New Zealand
- Egyptian goose, successfully introduced to eastern England and Israel. occasionally feral in Europe; introduced unsuccessfully to New Zealand, Australia, and the United States
- Muscovy duck, feral in many parts of the world; introduced successfully to areas of the United States; introduced unsuccessfully to Adams Island, New Zealand
- Mallard, successfully introduced to the eastern United States, Bermuda, Australia, New Zealand, the Falkland Islands, Macquarie Island, Colombia, South Africa, possibly the Falkland Islands and Kerguelen; introduced successfully to the Hawaiian Islands though also a vagrant, introduced unsuccessfully to Tahiti
- Hawaiian duck, re-introduced successfully to the Hawaiian Islands
- Meller's duck, possibly successfully introduced to Mauritius; unsuccessfully introduced to Réunion
- Blue-winged teal, possibly introduced to the Hawaiian Islands
- Northern pintail, successfully introduced to Île Saint-Paul and Amsterdam Island in the southern Indian Ocean; unsuccessfully introduced to New Zealand
- Eurasian wigeon, unsuccessfully introduced to New Zealand
- Gadwall, possibly unsuccessfully introduced to New Zealand
- Mandarin duck, successfully introduced to England, Europe and the United States, unsuccessfully introduced to Australia, New Zealand and Tahiti
- Red-crested pochard, successfully introduced to England
- Pochard, unsuccessfully introduced to New Zealand
- Tufted duck, unsuccessfully introduced to New Zealand
- Ruddy duck, successfully introduced to Great Britain, and range has since expanded into Europe and North Africa, but subsequently largely eradicated Europe-wide eradication underway.

== Galliformes ==
=== Megapodidae ===
- Malleefowl, possibly introduced successfully to parts of Queensland, unsuccessfully introduced to Kangaroo Island and Rottnest Island, Australia
- Australian brushturkey, introduced unsuccessfully to Kangaroo Island and Dunk Island in Australia

=== Cracidae ===
- Plain chachalaca, successfully introduced to Sapelo Island and possibly Blackbeard Island, Georgia, US
- Black curassow, possibly introduced unsuccessfully to Haiti and New Zealand
- Great curassow, unsuccessfully introduced to the Hawaiian Islands, Haiti, the United States, Panama
- Crested guan, unsuccessfully introduced to the Hawaiian Islands
- Rufous-vented chachalaca, possibly introduced (possibly colonised) to the Grenadines, Bequia, Union Island and Saint Vincent in the Caribbean
- Chestnut-winged chachalaca, probably unsuccessfully introduced to the Hawaiian Islands

=== Tetraonidae ===
- Capercaillie, successfully re-introduced to Scotland and possibly to some parts of mainland Europe; unsuccessfully introduced to North America
- Eurasian black grouse, re-introduced successfully to areas of Great Britain, and possibly Poland and Russia; unsuccessfully introduced to Ireland, North America and New Zealand
- Willow grouse, possibly re-introduced successfully to Poland; unsuccessfully introduced to New Zealand, Fiji and the United States.
- Red grouse introduced to southern England (Dartmoor, Exmoor), unsuccessfully introduced to Belgium
- Rock ptarmigan, unsuccessfully introduced to Japan and possibly New Zealand
- Dusky grouse, introduced (status uncertain) to several islands in the Gulf of Alaska
- Spruce grouse, possibly successfully introduced to Newfoundland, Kodiak and Woody Island
- Hazel grouse, unsuccessfully introduced to the United States and possibly Poland
- Ruffed grouse, successfully introduced to Michigan, Missouri and Nevada, unsuccessfully elsewhere in the United States; successfully introduced to Anticosti Island and Newfoundland in Canada.
- Greater sage grouse, unsuccessfully re-introduced to New Mexico, unsuccessfully introduced to Montana and British Columbia
- Sharp-tailed grouse, unsuccessfully introduced to the Hawaiian Islands and New Zealand
- Greater prairie chicken, unsuccessfully introduced to areas of the United States, the Hawaiian Islands and New Zealand
- Lesser prairie chicken, unsuccessfully introduced to the Hawaiian Islands

=== Phasianidae ===
- Himalayan snowcock, introduced successfully to the United States
- Chukar, introduced successfully to Russia, the United States, Canada, Mexico, the Hawaiian Islands, New Zealand, St Helena, and possibly Australia, Eleuthera in the Bahamas, and South Africa; unsuccessfully introduced to France, Ukraine, and Alaska, widely released and feral in Great Britain
- See-see partridge, introduced unsuccessfully to the United States and the Hawaiian Islands
- Sand partridge, introduced unsuccessfully to Cyprus
- Snow partridge, introduced unsuccessfully to the Hawaiian Islands and the United States
- Red-legged partridge, introduced successfully to Great Britain, the Azores, Madeira, France, the Netherlands, Belgium, Germany, and possibly the Balearic Islands in the Mediterranean, the Canary Islands, Porto Santo, and northern Spain and Portugal; unsuccessfully introduced to the United States, the Hawaiian Islands, Australia and New Zealand
- Barbary partridge, introduced successfully to the Canary Islands and Gibraltar, and possibly Sardegna; unsuccessfully introduced to Great Britain, New Zealand, Australia, the United States and the Hawaiian Islands
- Arabian partridge, possibly unsuccessfully introduced to Eritrea
- Black francolin, introduced successfully to the United States, the Hawaiian Islands, and Guam; possibly unsuccessfully introduced to Saudi Arabia
- Chinese francolin, successfully introduced to Mauritius, the Philippines, and possibly Madagascar and the Seychelles; unsuccessfully introduced to Oman, Réunion and the Hawaiian Islands
- Grey francolin, successfully introduced to the Amirante Islands, the Hawaiian Islands, the Seychelles, Rodrigues and possibly Mauritius, Réunion, and the United States; unsuccessfully introduced to Diego Garcia in the Chagos Archipelago and to the Andaman Islands
- Red-billed francolin, introduced, perhaps successfully, to Hawaii in the Hawaiian Islands
- Heuglin's francolin, unsuccessfully introduced to the Hawaiian Islands
- Clapperton's francolin, unsuccessfully introduced to the Hawaiian Islands
- Erckel's francolin, successfully introduced to the Hawaiian Islands; unsuccessfully introduced to the United States
- Red-necked francolin, successfully introduced to Ascension Island
- Yellow-necked francolin, unsuccessfully introduced to the Hawaiian Islands
- Grey partridge, successfully re-introduced to Russia, Finland, France and Italy; successfully introduced to the United States and Canada; unsuccessfully introduced to the Inner Hebrides, the Orkney Islands, the Outer Hebrides, Norway, the Hawaiian Islands, Fiji, Australia, Tasmania, New Zealand, and Chile
- Daurian partridge, successfully introduced to the Philippines; unsuccessfully introduced to Japan
- Madagascar partridge, unsuccessfully introduced to Mauritius and Réunion
- Common quail, introduced successfully to Réunion; introduced unsuccessfully to the United States and Tahiti; possibly introduced unsuccessfully to Australia, New Zealand, the Seychelles, Mauritius and France
- Japanese quail, introduced successfully to the Hawaiian Islands; introduced unsuccessfully to the United States
- Stubble quail, unsuccessfully introduced to New Zealand and the Hawaiian Islands
- Brown quail, successfully introduced to New Zealand
- Asian blue quail, successfully introduced to Guam; unsuccessfully introduced to Mauritius, Réunion, the Hawaiian Islands, and possibly New Zealand and the United States
- Jungle bush quail, unsuccessfully introduced to Mauritius and Réunion
- Taiwan partridge (also called Taiwan hill partridge, unsuccessfully introduced to Japan
- Crested wood partridge, unsuccessfully introduced to the Hawaiian Islands
- Chinese bamboo partridge, successfully introduced to Japan; unsuccessfully introduced to the United States, Russia and the Hawaiian Islands
- Temminck's tragopan, possibly introduced unsuccessfully to New Zealand
- Himalayan monal, unsuccessfully introduced to Australia and France
- Brown eared pheasant, introduced unsuccessfully to Alaska
- Silver pheasant, unsuccessfully introduced to New Zealand, Australia, the Hawaiian Islands, the United States, Canada, France, Great Britain, Russia, and Colombia
- Kalij pheasant, successfully introduced to the Hawaiian Islands; unsuccessfully introduced to the United States and Alaska
- Swinhoe's pheasant, unsuccessfully introduced to Japan
- Crested fireback, unsuccessfully introduced to Australia
- Red junglefowl, successfully introduced in Micronesia, Melanesia, Polynesia, Réunion, the Grenadines, Australia, Hawaiian Islands, the United States, and South Africa; possibly introduced to the Philippines, much of Indonesia; unsuccessfully introduced to Hispaniola, Glorioso Islands, Chagos Archipelago, St Helena, Trinidad, New Zealand, and France
- Green junglefowl, successfully introduced to the Cocos-Keeling Islands
- Grey junglefowl, unsuccessfully introduced to the Hawaiian Islands
- Cheer pheasant, unsuccessfully introduced to Europe and Alaska
- Common pheasant, successfully introduced to Europe, North America, the Hawaiian Islands, New Zealand, Japan, St Helena, and on King Island, Rottnest Island and Tasmania, Australia; unsuccessfully introduced to mainland Australia, the Dominican Republic, Panama, Pitcairn Island, Taiwan, Madeira, Alaska, Bermuda, Peru, Tahiti, Mauritius, Kangaroo Island, Chile, and Cyprus
- Green pheasant, successfully introduced to the Hawaiian Islands
- Reeves's pheasant, successfully introduced to France; unsuccessfully introduced to the Hawaiian Islands, Great Britain, Ireland, the United States, Alaska, and New Zealand
- Copper pheasant, unsuccessfully introduced to the Hawaiian Islands and the United States
- Golden pheasant, successfully introduced to Great Britain; unsuccessfully introduced to the United States, Canada, the Hawaiian Islands, New Zealand, Colombia, and Tahiti
- Lady Amherst's pheasant, successfully introduced to England, but now locally extinct; unsuccessfully introduced to the Hawaiian Islands, Colombia and possibly New Zealand
- Indian peafowl, successfully introduced to Pakistan, Japan, California, Hawaiian Islands, Andaman Islands, New Zealand, Rottnest Island, Heron Island, King Island in Australia; unsuccessfully introduced to the Florida, Dominican Republic, St Helena, Tahiti, and Madeira. Feral and occasional breeder in England.

=== Odontophoridae ===
- Mountain quail, introduced successfully to Vancouver Island in Canada and to some areas of the United States; possibly to the Hawaiian Islands; introduced unsuccessfully to New Zealand
- Scaled quail, introduced successfully to some areas of the United States, and probably introduced unsuccessfully to the Hawaiian Islands
- California quail, introduced successfully to New Zealand, the Hawaiian Islands, Chile, Juan Fernández, Argentina, parts of Canada and the United States, King Island and Norfolk Island in Australia; unsuccessfully introduced to Australia, Tasmania, France, Tahiti, and perhaps Fiji, Tonga and South Africa
- Gambel's quail, introduced successfully in areas of the United States and to the Hawaiian Islands
- Northern bobwhite, re-introduced successfully to parts of the United States; introduced successfully to Haiti, the Dominican Republic, the Bahamas, France, Italy, Japan and New Zealand; introduced successfully but now extirpated to Jamaica, Puerto Rico, Antigua, Guadeloupe, Martinique, Barbados, St Croix, St Kitts, and Bermuda; introduced unsuccessfully to Peru, Canada, the Hawaiian Islands, Ireland, Great Britain, China, and South Africa
- Crested bobwhite, introduced successfully to the Grenadines and the Virgin Islands
- Montezuma quail, introduced unsuccessfully to the Hawaiian Islands

=== Numididae ===
- Helmeted guineafowl, introduced successfully to Hispaniola, Cuba, the Isle of Pines, Australia, and probably in Arabia, Madagascar, the Comoros, Mauritius, Agaléga Islands, Annobón, Cape Verde and Barbuda; now extirpated after successful introduction on Rodrigues; possibly successfully introduced to France, New Zealand, Australia and the Hawaiian Islands; unsuccessfully introduced to Ascension Island, the Chagos Archipelago, St Helena, Jamaica, Puerto Rico, Trinidad, Gonâve Island, Madeira, and the United States. Has bred ferally in England.

=== Meleagrididae ===
- Wild turkey, successfully re-introduced to areas of the United States and Canada; introduced successfully to the Hawaiian Islands, Mauritius, Germany, New Zealand, and Tasmania; unsuccessfully introduced to Hispaniola and Fiji

== Pelecaniformes ==
=== Pelecanidae ===
- Brown pelican, successfully re-introduced to Louisiana

=== Phalacrocoracidae ===
- Great cormorant, introduced unsuccessfully to the Hawaiian Islands
- Guanay cormorant, possibly introduced unsuccessfully to Isla San Jerónimo, Baja California

== Ciconiiformes ==
=== Ardeidae ===
- Cattle egret, successfully introduced to the Hawaiian Islands, Chagos Archipelago, Seychelles and possibly Rodrigues Island; unsuccessfully introduced to Mauritius and Australia, which it has colonised naturally
- Nankeen night heron, unsuccessfully introduced to New Zealand and Bird Island (Western Australia)
- Black-crowned night heron, unsuccessfully introduced to Scotland and Norfolk, England (free-flying colonies now subject to control).

=== Threskiornithidae ===
- Scarlet ibis, successfully introduced to Florida, possibly introduced unsuccessfully to Canada
- Sacred ibis, successfully introduced to France, Italy, Taiwan and Florida, feral elsewhere in western Europe.
- Bald ibis, successfully re-introduced to Turkey, ongoing re-introduction schemes in Austria and Spain to restore species to former range (success as yet unknown)

=== Phoenicopteridae ===
- American flamingo, unsuccessfully introduced to the Hawaiian Islands
- Chilean flamingo, successfully introduced to the Netherlands and Germany, occasionally feral and has bred elsewhere in western Europe including Britain.

=== Cathartidae ===
- Turkey vulture, successfully introduced to Puerto Rico, Hispaniola and possibly the Bahamas
- California condor, successfully re-introduced to California and Arizona

== Falconiformes ==
=== Accipitridae ===
- Griffon vulture, reintroduced into many areas of Europe
- White-tailed eagle, successfully re-introduced to Scotland, reintroduction programme in Isle Of Wight resulted in successful breeding and fledging of one young bird in southern England in 2023
- Swamp harrier, successfully introduced to Tahiti
- Osprey, successfully re-introduced to England (Lake District, Hampshire and Rutland Water), had earlier naturally re-colonised Scotland and also later Wales.

=== Falconidae ===
- Peregrine falcon, successfully re-introduced in parts of the United States
- Chimango caracara, successfully introduced to Easter Island

== Gruiformes ==
=== Rallidae ===
- Weka, successfully introduced to Macquarie Island (now extirpated), Chatham Islands and other New Zealand islands
- Corncrake, unsuccessfully introduced to the United States, currently being re-introduced to the Nene Washes, eastern England (success as yet unknown).
- Laysan rail, unsuccessfully introduced to several islands in the Hawaiian Islands
- Common moorhen, successfully introduced to St Helena
- Gough Island moorhen, re-introduced, possibly successfully, to Tristan da Cunha
- Grey-headed swamphen, successfully introduced to the United States; unsuccessfully introduced to the Hawaiian Islands and possibly Argentina

=== Gruidae ===
- Demoiselle crane, unsuccessfully introduced to France
- Brolga, unsuccessfully introduced to Fiji

== Charadriiformes ==
=== Turnicidae ===
- Madagascar buttonquail, successfully introduced (or possibly colonised) the Glorioso Islands and Réunion; unsuccessfully introduced to Mauritius
- Painted buttonquail, unsuccessfully introduced to the Hawaiian Islands and possibly to New Zealand

=== Laridae ===
- Silver gull, unsuccessfully introduced to the Hawaiian Islands and Istanbul
- Western gull, unsuccessfully introduced to the Hawaiian Islands

=== Recurvirostridae ===
- Black-necked stilt, successfully introduced to Japan, possible subspecies of the native black-winged stilt

=== Charadriidae ===
- Northern lapwing, unsuccessfully introduced to New Zealand
- Grey plover, unsuccessfully introduced to New Zealand
- Eurasian golden plover, unsuccessfully introduced to New Zealand

== Pterocliformes ==
=== Pteroclidae ===
- Pallas's sandgrouse, unsuccessfully introduced to the United States
- Pin-tailed sandgrouse, unsuccessfully introduced to New Zealand and Australia
- Black-bellied sandgrouse, unsuccessfully introduced to Nevada and perhaps Australia
- Chestnut-bellied sandgrouse, successfully introduced to Hawaiian Islands; unsuccessfully introduced to Australia and perhaps to the United States

== Columbiformes ==
=== Columbidae ===
- Rock dove, successfully introduced in Eurasia, North Africa, North America, Central America, South America, the West Indies, the Bahamas, Bermuda, Juan Fernández, Easter Island, the Society Islands, Samoa, Fiji, the Hawaiian Islands, Australia, New Zealand, Norfolk Island, Mauritius, the Andaman and Nicobar islands, South Georgia, St Helena, the Marquesas, and probably elsewhere. Ubiquitous in cities worldwide.
- Pink-headed imperial pigeon, unsuccessfully introduced to the Cocos-Keeling Islands
- Wood pigeon, unsuccessfully introduced to the United States
- Mourning dove, successfully introduced to the Hawaiian Islands
- White-winged dove, unsuccessfully introduced to the Hawaiian Islands
- Turtle dove, unsuccessfully introduced to Australia and New Zealand
- Red turtle dove, possibly introduced to Malaysia and Singapore, unsuccessfully
- Madagascar turtle dove, successfully introduced to Diego Garcia; possibly successfully introduced to Mauritius and Réunion (perhaps native); N. p. picturatus successfully introduced to the Seychelles and Amirantes endemic with N. p. rostratus
- Eurasian collared dove successfully introduced to the United States, Puerto Rico, and Bahamas; unsuccessfully introduced to New Zealand
- Barbary dove; successfully introduced to the Canary Islands (occasionally feral elsewhere in Europe, successfully introduced to the United States, possibly successfully introduced to the Hawaiian Islands and to Alice Springs in Australia
- Red-eyed dove, possibly introduced to Cape Peninsula, South Africa (perhaps colonised)
- Island collared dove, possibly introduced successfully in Sumatra; unsuccessfully introduced to Borneo and New Zealand
- Philippine collared dove, successfully introduced to the Mariana Islands
- Spotted dove, successfully introduced to eastern Indonesia, Fiji, New Britain, New Caledonia, New Zealand, the Hawaiian Islands, Australia, southern California and Mauritius
- Laughing dove, successfully introduced to Israel and Western Australia.
- Peaceful dove and/or zebra dove, successfully introduced to St Helena, Madagascar, Mauritius, Seychelles, Réunion, Glorioso Islands, Rodrigues, Chagos Archipelago, Tahiti, the Hawaiian Islands, Thailand, Borneo, the Philippines, and possibly Cosmoledos, Farquhar, Sulawesi, and Amboina; unsuccessfully introduced to Kangaroo Island
- Diamond dove, unsuccessfully introduced to New Zealand, the Hawaiian Islands, and Kangaroo Island
- Bar-shouldered dove, unsuccessfully introduced to the Hawaiian Islands and Kangaroo Island
- Inca dove, introduced unsuccessfully to southern Florida
- Common ground dove, possibly introduced successfully to Bermuda
- Namaqua dove, unsuccessfully introduced to New Zealand and Australia
- Emerald dove, unsuccessfully introduced to the Hawaiian Islands and perhaps New Zealand
- Common bronzewing, unsuccessfully introduced to New Zealand and the Hawaiian Islands
- Crested pigeon, possibly successfully introduced to Kangaroo Island; unsuccessfully introduced to the Hawaiian Islands, New Zealand, Europe and the United States
- Partridge pigeon, unsuccessfully introduced to the Hawaiian Islands and perhaps New Zealand
- Spinifex pigeon, unsuccessfully introduced to the Hawaiian Islands and Kangaroo Island
- White-tipped dove, unsuccessfully introduced to the Hawaiian Islands
- Caribbean dove, introduced, perhaps successfully, to New Providence in the Bahamas
- Ruddy quail-dove, unsuccessfully introduced to the Hawaiian Islands
- Luzon bleeding-heart, unsuccessfully introduced to the United States and the Hawaiian Islands
- Wonga pigeon, unsuccessfully introduced to New Zealand, Kangaroo Island and the Hawaiian Islands
- Blue-headed quail-dove, unsuccessfully introduced to Jamaica and the Hawaiian Islands
- Nicobar pigeon, unsuccessfully introduced to the Hawaiian Islands

== Psittaciformes ==
=== Strigopidae ===
- Kakapo, successfully, but tenuously, introduced to several islands off New Zealand

=== Cacatuidae ===
- Gang-gang cockatoo, unsuccessfully introduced to Kangaroo Island
- Sulphur-crested cockatoo, successfully introduced to New Zealand, Western Australia, Palau, Puerto Rico and in some Indonesian islands; unsuccessfully introduced to Singapore and the Hawaiian Islands
- Yellow-crested cockatoo, successfully introduced to Singapore and Hong Kong
- Moluccan cockatoo, possibly introduced to Amboina in the Moluccas; an occasional escapee in the Hawaiian Islands
- Major Mitchell's cockatoo, unsuccessfully introduced to Fiji
- Tanimbar corella, possibly introduced successfully to Tual in the Kai Islands, Indonesia and Singapore
- Galah, unsuccessfully introduced to the Hawaiian Islands
- Long-billed corella, successfully introduced to coastal Australia around urban areas; unsuccessfully introduced to the Chagos Archipelago
- Cockatiel, successfully introduced to Puerto Rico, unsuccessfully introduced to the United States and New Zealand

=== Psittacidae ===
- Blue-streaked lory, possibly introduced successfully to the Kai Islands and Damar Islands, Indonesia
- Rainbow lorikeet, successfully introduced to Perth, Western Australia
- Coconut lorikeet, successfully introduced to Hong Kong. Possible confusion with rainbow lorikeet as they were previously considered conspecific.
- Kuhl's lorikeet, successfully introduced to the Line Islands in the Pacific Ocean
- Tahitian lory, possibly successfully re-introduced to Aitutaki in the Cook Islands; unsuccessfully re-introduced to Tahiti
- Musk lorikeet, unsuccessfully introduced to Western Australia
- Blue-and-yellow macaw, introduced successfully to Florida and Puerto Rico
- Red-and-green macaw, introduced successfully to Puerto Rico
- Scarlet macaw, introduced successfully to Puerto Rico, unsuccessfully introduced to the Hawaiian Islands and The Netherlands
- Chestnut-fronted macaw, introduced successfully to Florida
- Brown-throated parakeet, successfully introduced to the Virgin Islands and possibly the United States
- Orange-fronted parakeet, possibly successfully introduced to Florida
- Blue-crowned parakeet, successfully introduced to California
- Red-masked parakeet, successfully introduced to California and the Hawaiian Islands
- Mitred conure, successfully introduced to California and the Hawaiian Islands
- Nanday conure, introduced in the United States and Puerto Rico, introduced unsuccessfully in Israel the Hawaiian Islands
- Maroon-faced parakeet, successfully possibly re-introduced to the area around Rio de Janeiro, Brazil
- Monk parakeet, successfully introduced to Puerto Rico, Italy, Israel, England and the United States
- Green-rumped parrotlet, successfully introduced to Jamaica and Barbados, and possibly Curaçao and Tobago; unsuccessfully introduced to Martinique
- Yellow-chevroned parakeet, successfully introduced to the United States
- Canary-winged parakeet, successfully introduced to Peru, Puerto Rico, and the United States
- Orange-chinned parakeet, unsuccessfully introduced to the United States and the Hawaiian Islands
- Hispaniolan amazon, successfully introduced to Puerto Rico; unsuccessfully introduced to Florida
- White-fronted amazon, unsuccessfully introduced to Florida
- Red-crowned amazon, successfully introduced to the United States and the Hawaiian Islands
- Red-lored amazon, introduced successfully to California and possibly Florida
- Yellow-crowned amazon, introduced, possibly successfully, in the United States and Trinidad; unsuccessfully introduced to the Hawaiian Islands
- Orange-winged amazon, successfully introduced to Puerto Rico, unsuccessfully introduced to the United States
- Yellow-shouldered amazon unsuccessfully introduced to Florida
- Lilac-crowned amazon introduced successfully to California; unsuccessfully introduced to Florida
- Festive amazon unsuccessfully introduced to Florida
- Red-spectacled amazon unsuccessfully introduced to Florida
- Mealy amazon unsuccessfully introduced to Florida
- Turquoise-fronted amazon introduced successfully to California, unsuccessfully introduced to Florida
- Yellow-headed amazon introduced successfully to California; unsuccessfully introduced to Florida
- Yellow-naped amazon unsuccessfully introduced to Florida
- Meyer's parrot, successfully introduced to Cape Province in South Africa, now extirpated
- Greater vasa parrot, unsuccessfully introduced to Réunion
- Eclectus parrot, successfully introduced to Palau and to the Goram Islands, Indonesia; unsuccessfully introduced to the Hawaiian Islands
- Blue-naped parrot, successfully introduced to the area of Borneo
- Great-billed parrot, possibly introduced, successfully, to Balut Island, Indonesia
- Rose-ringed parakeet, successfully introduced to Mauritius, Zanzibar, Italy, England, Israel, Oman, Yemen, Hong Kong, Macau, Japan, Kenya, Turkey, the United States, and the Hawaiian Islands; unsuccessfully introduced to Egypt, Singapore, Cape Verde and the Andaman Islands
- Alexandrine parakeet, successfully introduced to Japan, unsuccessfully introduced to Israel
- Senegal parrot, unsuccessfully introduced to Israel
- Red-breasted parakeet, introduced successfully to Japan, Borneo and Pinang Island; unsuccessfully introduced to Singapore
- Plum-headed parakeet, unsuccessfully introduced to the United States
- Red shining parrot, unsuccessfully introduced to Vanuatu and Fiji
- Madagascar lovebird, perhaps introduced successfully to Rodrigues, Réunion, the Comoros and the Seychelles; unsuccessfully introduced to Mauritius, Zanzibar, and the Mafia Islands, and possibly to South Africa
- Peach-faced lovebird, successfully introduced to Arizona; unsuccessfully introduced to Western Australia, the Hawaiian Islands, and Florida
- Fischer's lovebird, successfully introduced to the Tanga area of Tanzania and southern Kenya; unsuccessfully introduced to Florida
- Masked lovebird, successfully introduced to Dar es Salaam, Tanzania and to Nairobi, Kenya and the Canary Islands; unsuccessfully introduced to the United States
- Nyasa lovebird, possibly introduced successfully to Lundazi in Zambia and to Namibia
- Crimson rosella, successfully introduced to Norfolk Island and New Zealand unsuccessfully introduced to Lord Howe Island and Western Australia
- Eastern rosella, successfully introduced to New Zealand and possibly near Adelaide, South Australia
- Pale-headed rosella, introduced unsuccessfully to the Hawaiian Islands
- Yellow-fronted parakeet, possibly successfully re-introduced to Stephens Island, New Zealand
- Budgerigar, successfully introduced to the United States, Japan and Puerto Rico, unsuccessfully introduced to England, South Africa, the Hawaiian Islands, Hong Kong, South America and New Zealand

== Strigiformes ==
=== Tytonidae ===
- Barn owl, successfully introduced to the Seychelles, the Hawaiian Islands, and possibly St Helena; unsuccessfully introduced to New Zealand [self introduced to North Island] and Lord Howe Island
- Masked owl, successfully introduced to Lord Howe Island

=== Strigidae ===
- Eurasian eagle-owl, re-introduced to parts of Sweden, possibly successfully introduced (or natural coloniser) to England.
- Southern boobook, unsuccessfully introduced to New Zealand (Australian race) and Lord Howe Island
- Little owl, successfully introduced to England and New Zealand
- Tawny owl, unsuccessfully introduced to New Zealand

== Apodiformes ==
=== Apodidae ===
- Mariana swiftlet, successfully introduced to the Hawaiian Islands
- Edible-nest swiftlet, possibly successfully introduced to Burma; unsuccessfully introduced to the Hawaiian Islands

=== Trochilidae ===
- Many hummingbirds of unknown species have been introduced to Brazil, Ecuador, Peru and Venezuela, although none are believed to have been successful

== Coraciiformes ==
=== Alcedinidae ===
- Laughing kookaburra, successfully introduced to Western Australia, Kangaroo Island, Flinders Island in Tasmania and New Zealand; unsuccessfully introduced to Fiji

== Passeriformes ==
=== Tyrannidae ===
- Great kiskadee, successfully introduced to Bermuda

=== Menuridae ===
- Superb lyrebird, successfully introduced to Tasmania

=== Alaudidae ===
- Mongolian lark, unsuccessfully introduced to the Hawaiian Islands
- Wood lark, unsuccessfully introduced to the United States and perhaps to Australia and New Zealand
- Skylark, successfully introduced to New Zealand, Australia, Tasmania, Kangaroo Island, Lord Howe Island, the Hawaiian Islands and Canada; unsuccessfully introduced to the United States

=== Pycnonotidae ===
- Red-whiskered bulbul, successfully introduced to Japan, Malaysia, Singapore, the Nicobar Islands, Mauritius, Réunion, Australia, the United States, and the Hawaiian Islands, and perhaps to Sumatra and Java
- Red-vented bulbul, successfully introduced to Fiji, Samoa, Tonga, United States and the Hawaiian Islands; unsuccessfully introduced to Australia and New Zealand
- Sooty-headed bulbul, introduced, perhaps successfully, to Sumatra and Sulawesi; introduced unsuccessfully to Singapore
- Réunion bulbul, unsuccessfully introduced to Diego Garcia in the Chagos Archipelago
- White-eared bulbul, successfully introduced to the Arabian Peninsula

=== Cinclidae ===
- White-throated dipper, unsuccessfully introduced to the United States

=== Mimidae ===
- Northern mockingbird, successfully introduced to the Hawaiian Islands; unsuccessfully introduced to Bermuda, Barbados, St Helena, Tahiti and the northern United States
- Tropical mockingbird, possibly successfully introduced to Caucatal in Colombia and Panama; unsuccessfully introduced to Barbados and Nevis

=== Prunellidae ===
- Dunnock, successfully introduced to New Zealand; unsuccessfully introduced to the United States

=== Turdidae ===
- Western bluebird, unsuccessfully introduced to Tahiti
- Hermit thrush, unsuccessfully introduced to Australia
- Blackbird, successfully introduced to Australia, Tasmania, Lord Howe Island, Norfolk Island and New Zealand; unsuccessfully introduced to South Africa, St Helena, the United States and Fiji
- Island thrush, successfully introduced to the Cocos-Keeling Islands, now extirpated
- Song thrush, successfully introduced to Australia, Norfolk Island and Lord Howe Island and New Zealand; unsuccessfully introduced to South Africa, St Helena and the United States
- American robin, unsuccessfully introduced to Great Britain, though they are natural vagrants to Greenland and western Europe including Great Britain
- Western red-legged thrush, unsuccessfully introduced to Grand Cayman Island in the West Indies

=== Sylviidae ===
- Japanese bush warbler, successfully introduced to the Hawaiian Islands
- Common whitethroat, unsuccessfully introduced to New Zealand
- Blackcap, unsuccessfully introduced to the United States and probably New Zealand

=== Muscicapidae ===
- European robin, unsuccessfully introduced to Australia, New Zealand, Canada, and the United States
- Japanese robin, unsuccessfully introduced to the Hawaiian Islands
- Ryūkyū robin, unsuccessfully introduced to the Hawaiian Islands
- Nightingale, unsuccessfully introduced to Australia, New Zealand, the United States and South Africa
- Oriental magpie robin, introduced, perhaps successfully, to the Hawaiian Islands
- White-rumped shama, successfully introduced to the Hawaiian Islands
- Seychelles magpie robin, unsuccessfully introduced to Alphonse Island in the Amirantes
- Blue-and-white flycatcher, unsuccessfully introduced to the Hawaiian Islands
- Narcissus flycatcher, unsuccessfully introduced to the Hawaiian Islands

=== Timaliidae ===
- White-crested laughingthrush, unsuccessfully introduced to the Hawaiian Islands
- Greater necklaced laughingthrush, successfully introduced to the Hawaiian Islands
- Black-throated laughingthrush, unsuccessfully introduced to the Hawaiian Islands
- Hwamei, successfully introduced to the Hawaiian Islands, Japan and Taiwan, unsuccessfully introduced to the United States
- White-browed laughingthrush, possibly successfully introduced to Hong Kong
- Moustached laughingthrush, successfully introduced to Japan
- Red-billed leiothrix, successfully introduced to the Hawaiian Islands, Italy, France, Japan, and perhaps Hong Kong; feral elsewhere in western Europe; unsuccessfully introduced to Australia, Tahiti, Colombia and the United States

=== Maluridae ===
- Superb fairy-wren, unsuccessfully introduced to New Zealand

=== Paridae ===
- Great tit, successfully introduced to the United States (Illinois and Wisconsin)
- Varied tit, introduced, perhaps successfully, to the Hawaiian Islands
- Blue tit, unsuccessfully introduced to Canada and New Zealand

=== Zosteropidae ===
- Silvereye, successfully introduced to Tahiti; unsuccessfully introduced to Lord Howe Island
- Japanese white-eye, successfully introduced to the Hawaiian Islands
- Swinhoe's white-eye, successfully introduced to California
- Christmas Island white-eye, successfully introduced to the Cocos-Keeling Islands

=== Meliphagidae ===
- Noisy miner, unsuccessfully introduced to the Solomon Islands, unsuccessfully introduced to New Zealand

=== Dicruridae ===
- Magpie-lark, unsuccessfully introduced to New Zealand, the Hawaiian Islands and Fiji
- Willie wagtail, unsuccessfully introduced to the Hawaiian Islands
- Black drongo, successfully introduced to Guam and Rota Island in the southern Mariana Islands

=== Callaeidae ===
- Saddleback, introduced and re-introduced successfully to many islands off New Zealand for the preservation of this rare species

=== Artamidae ===
- Australian magpie, successfully introduced to New Zealand, the Solomon Islands, Fiji, and possibly to King Island, Flinders Island and Kangaroo Island; unsuccessfully introduced to Sri Lanka and to Rottnest Island
- Grey currawong, unsuccessfully introduced to Fiji

=== Paradisaeidae ===
- Greater bird-of-paradise, unsuccessfully introduced to the West Indies (due to overhunting by humans)

=== Corvidae ===
- Red-billed blue magpie, introduced, possibly successfully, to the Hawaiian Islands
- Korean magpie, successfully introduced to Kyūshū, Japan
- Jackdaw, unsuccessfully introduced to New Zealand
- House crow, successfully introduced to the Netherlands [extirpated], Israel, Egypt (all ship-assisted colonisers), Malaysia, Singapore, Kenya, Zanzibar, Yemen, Djibouti, Sudan and South Africa; introduced, probably successfully, to Thailand, Pemba Island in east Africa, Oman and Mauritius; unsuccessfully introduced to the Andaman Islands and Australia
- New Caledonian crow, successfully introduced to the Maré Island in New Caledonia
- Rook, successfully introduced to New Zealand
- American crow, unsuccessfully introduced to Bermuda (now a successful colonist)
- Large-billed crow, unsuccessfully introduced to the Nicobar Islands
- Pied crow, unsuccessfully introduced to Mauritius

=== Sturnidae ===
- White-headed starling, unsuccessfully introduced to Camorta Island in the Nicobar Islands
- Rosy starling, unsuccessfully introduced to Mauritius
- Common starling, successfully introduced to the United States, South America (Brazil, Uruguay and Argentina) Jamaica, South Africa, Australia, New Zealand, and the Chatham Islands, and Fiji and Tonga; unsuccessfully introduced to Cuba and Venezuela
- Indian pied myna, successfully introduced to Japan 1961 but died out 1981
- Black-collared starling, unsuccessfully introduced to the Hawaiian Islands
- Common myna, successfully introduced to Israel, Australia, New Zealand, South Africa, St Helena, Seychelles, Réunion, Rodrigues, Mauritius, the Comoros, Madagascar, Chagos Archipelago, Ascension Island, Solomon Islands, New Caledonia, Fiji, the Society Islands, the Cook Islands, the United States, the Hawaiian Islands, France, Balearic Islands, widely throughout Asia and probably to the Nicobar Islands, the Laccadive Islands, the Maldives and Vanuatu; unsuccessfully introduced to the Andaman Islands and England
- Vinous breasted myna, successfully introduced to Israel
- Javan myna, successfully introduced to Puerto Rico
- Jungle myna, successfully introduced to Fiji and Samoa, and perhaps Singapore, Sumatra and the Andaman Islands; unsuccessfully introduced to Christmas Island (near Australia)
- Crested myna, successfully introduced to Malaysia, the Philippines, Portugal (Lisbon area), Japan, and Canada (now extirpated)
- Common hill myna, successfully introduced to the United States and Puerto Rico, unsuccessfully introduced to Christmas Island and the Hawaiian Islands, and perhaps also St Helena, the Chagos Archipelago and Hong Kong
- Bank myna, successfully introduced into the Middle East, Maldives, Taiwan and Japan.

=== Passeridae ===
- House sparrow, successfully introduced to the United States, Canada, Puerto Rico, Argentina, Uruguay, Brazil, Chile, Peru, Ecuador, Easter Island, Falkland Islands, Cuba, Hawaiian Islands, Eastern Australia, New Zealand, New Caledonia, South Africa, Mozambique, Somalia, Sudan, Zanzibar, Amirantes, Mauritius, Réunion, Rodrigues, Chagos Archipelago, Azores, Cape Verde, and colonised from these Mexico, Guatemala, Paraguay, Bermuda, Norfolk Island, Namibia, Botswana, Zimbabwe, and Zambia; probably introduced successfully to the Comoros, the Seychelles, Vanuatu and Kenya; unsuccessfully introduced to Jamaica, the Bahamas, St Helena, Greenland, Western Australia, the Philippines, Papua New Guinea and South Georgia Island
- Spanish sparrow, introduced (or possibly colonised) to the Canary Islands, Cape Verde and Madeira
- Tree sparrow, successfully introduced to the Philippines, Mariana Islands, Lesser Sunda Islands, Sulawesi, Pescadores, Australia, the central United States and eastern Malaysia, as well as (possibly) Singapore; unsuccessfully introduced to New Zealand and Bermuda

=== Ploceidae ===
- Scaly weaver, unsuccessfully introduced to St Helena
- Cape weaver, unsuccessfully introduced to Mauritius
- Village weaver, successfully introduced to Portugal, Venezuela, Mauritius, Puerto Rico, Haiti and the Dominican Republic, and probably to Réunion; possibly colonised or introduced to São Tomé; unsuccessfully introduced to Cape Verde
- Black-headed weaver, possibly introduced successfully to São Tomé, successfully to Iberia.
- Asian golden weaver, unsuccessfully introduced to the Cocos-Keeling Islands
- Baya weaver, unsuccessfully introduced to the Hawaiian Islands and Hong Kong
- Streaked weaver, successfully introduced onto the Arabian Peninsula
- Red-billed quelea. successfully introduced to Réunion
- Madagascar fody, successfully introduced to the Amirantes, Seychelles, Chagos Archipelago, Mauritius, Réunion, Rodrigues and St Helena, and possibly the Comoros and Glorioso Islands (perhaps colonised)
- Seychelles fody, unsuccessfully introduced to the Amirante Islands
- Yellow-crowned bishop, successfully introduced to Puerto Rico and Portugal, introduced to the Hawaiian Islands (uncertain status)
- Northern red bishop, successfully introduced to California, unsuccessfully introduced to Australia, the Hawaiian Islands, Tahiti and St Helena
- White-winged widowbird, unsuccessfully introduced to Australia and St Helena
- Long-tailed widowbird, unsuccessfully introduced to St Helena

=== Estrildidae ===
- Green-winged pytilia, unsuccessfully introduced to St Helena
- Red-billed firefinch, unsuccessfully introduced to Tahiti and perhaps the Hawaiian Islands
- Blue-breasted cordon-bleu, introduced possibly successfully to Zanzibar; unsuccessfully introduced to Tahiti, St Helena and the Hawaiian Islands
- Red-cheeked cordon-bleu, successfully introduced to the Hawaiian Islands; unsuccessfully introduced to Cape Verde and Tahiti
- Blue-capped cordon-bleu, perhaps successfully introduced to the Hawaiian Islands
- Violet-eared waxbill, unsuccessfully introduced to St Helena
- Lavender waxbill, successfully introduced to the Hawaiian Islands
- Yellow-bellied waxbill, unsuccessfully introduced to St Helena
- Orange-cheeked waxbill, successfully introduced to Puerto Rico, California and the Hawaiian Islands; unsuccessfully introduced to Tahiti
- Common waxbill, successfully introduced to St Helena, Mauritius, Ascension Island, Rodrigues, Amirantes, Seychelles, Réunion, Cape Verde, São Tomé, New Caledonia, Tahiti, Brazil, Puerto Rico, the Hawaiian Islands, Portugal and Spain, unsuccessfully introduced to Madagascar, Israel, the Comoros, Príncipe, and Fiji
- Black-rumped waxbill, successfully introduced to Portugal and the Hawaiian Islands; unsuccessfully introduced to Tahiti
- Black-cheeked waxbill, unsuccessfully introduced to St Helena
- Red avadavat, successfully introduced to Sumatra, the Philippines, Japan, Réunion, Hawaiian Islands, Fiji and Egypt, Iberian Peninsula, Italy, and perhaps Hong Kong; unsuccessfully introduced to Singapore, the Andaman Islands, Mauritius, the Comoros, Sri Lanka and Tahiti
- Green avadavat, unsuccessfully introduced to Lahore, Pakistan
- Zebra waxbill, unsuccessfully introduced to Tahiti and St Helena
- Red-browed firetail, successfully introduced to Tahiti; unsuccessfully introduced to New Zealand, Western Australia, Fiji and New Caledonia
- Diamond firetail, unsuccessfully introduced to New Zealand, Tahiti, Fiji and the Hawaiian Islands
- Star finch, unsuccessfully introduced to Tahiti
- Plum-headed finch, unsuccessfully introduced to Tahiti
- Zebra finch, unsuccessfully introduced to New Zealand, Tahiti, Nauru and Kangaroo Island
- Double-barred finch, unsuccessfully introduced to Tahiti
- Long-tailed finch, unsuccessfully introduced to Tahiti
- Pin-tailed parrotfinch, unsuccessfully introduced to Tahiti
- Blue-faced parrotfinch, unsuccessfully introduced to Tahiti
- Red-throated parrotfinch, unsuccessfully introduced to Tahiti
- Red-headed parrotfinch, unsuccessfully introduced to Tahiti
- Gouldian finch, unsuccessfully introduced to Tahiti
- Indian silverbill, successfully introduced to Israel and Jordan. unsuccessfully introduced to Puerto Rico
- African silverbill, successfully introduced to the Hawaiian Islands, Portugal and Qatar
- Bronze mannikin, successfully introduced to Puerto Rico; unsuccessfully introduced to Tahiti
- Magpie mannikin, successfully introduced to Zanzibar (or perhaps colonised); unsuccessfully introduced to Tahiti
- Scaly-breasted munia, successfully introduced to Australia, Hawaiian Islands, Puerto Rico, US, Palau, Mauritius, Réunion, Cuba, Jamaica, the Dominican Republic, Saint Kitts & Nevis, Antigua and Barbuda, Guadeloupe and Dominica; unsuccessfully introduced to the Seychelles, Tahiti and New Zealand; successfully possibly introduced to Singapore and Portugal
- Javan munia, successfully introduced to Singapore and Malaysia
- Black-headed munia, successfully introduced to Japan, the Moluccas, Palau, Guam and the Hawaiian Islands; unsuccessfully introduced to Japan, Australia and Tahiti
- White-rumped munia, successfully introduced to Japan, unsuccessfully introduced to Réunion
- Chestnut-breasted munia, successfully introduced to the Society Islands and New Caledonia; unsuccessfully introduced to New Zealand and Western Australia
- Java sparrow, successfully introduced to parts of Indochina, China, Burma, Malaysia, Singapore, Thailand, Sri Lanka, Borneo, Lesser Sunda Islands, Sulawesi, Moluccas, Philippines, Christmas Island, Cocos-Keeling Islands, Tanzania, Zanzibar, Hawaiian Islands, Fiji, Japan, Taiwan, St Helena and Puerto Rico; unsuccessfully introduced to Mauritius, the Comoros, India, Seychelles, Florida in the United States, Australia and New Zealand
- Tricoloured munia, successfully introduced to Japan, Cuba, Jamaica, the Dominican Republic, Puerto Rico, Trinidad and Tobago, Venezuela, Colombia, Ecuador, Panama, Costa Rica, Honduras, and Belize; unsuccessfully introduced 2 Florida, US and Nicaragua

=== Viduidae ===
- Village indigobird, unsuccessfully introduced to the Hawaiian Islands
- Shaft-tailed whydah, unsuccessfully introduced to St Helena
- Pin-tailed whydah, introduced successfully to Japan, Puerto Rico and US, unsuccessfully introduced to Mayotte the Hawaiian Islands;
- Eastern paradise whydah, unsuccessfully introduced to St Helena

=== Fringillidae ===
- Common chaffinch, successfully introduced to New Zealand and South Africa; unsuccessfully introduced to Australia and the United States
- Brambling, unsuccessfully introduced to Australia and New Zealand
- Canary, successfully introduced to the Hawaiian Islands; unsuccessfully introduced to Australia, the United States, Bermuda, New Zealand, England, and Italy, hasn't established to Puerto Rico yet, as well as being frequently feral in other areas
- Cape canary, successfully introduced to Réunion; unsuccessfully introduced to Mauritius, St Helena and Tahiti
- White-rumped seedeater, unsuccessfully introduced to the Hawaiian Islands
- Yellow-fronted canary, successfully introduced to Mauritius, Réunion, Rodrigues and the Hawaiian Islands; unsuccessfully introduced to the Amirantes and St Helena
- Yellow canary, successfully introduced to St Helena and Ascension Island
- European greenfinch, successfully introduced to Australia, New Zealand, Uruguay and the Azores; unsuccessfully introduced to St Helena and the United States
- Eurasian siskin, unsuccessfully introduced to New Zealand, Australia and the United States
- American goldfinch, unsuccessfully introduced to Bermuda and Tahiti
- Lesser goldfinch, unsuccessfully introduced to Cuba
- European goldfinch, successfully introduced to Cape Verde, Australia, New Zealand, Uruguay, Argentina and Bermuda; the United States [Great Lakes, New York and Southern California], unsuccessfully to Canada and South Africa
- Lesser redpoll, successfully introduced to New Zealand
- Twite, unsuccessfully introduced to New Zealand
- Linnet, unsuccessfully introduced to New Zealand, Australia, Canada and the United States
- House finch, successfully introduced to the eastern United States and Hawaiian Islands
- Parrot crossbill, unsuccessfully introduced to the United States
- Eurasian bullfinch, unsuccessfully introduced to the New Zealand, Australia and the United States
- Hawfinch, unsuccessfully introduced to Australia
- Antillean euphonia, unsuccessfully introduced to Vieques Island in Puerto Rico

=== Drepanididae ===
- Laysan finch, introduced (probably for conservation purposes) successfully to several islands in the Hawaiian Islands

=== Thraupidae ===
- White-lined tanager, unsuccessfully introduced to Tahiti
- Summer tanager, unsuccessfully introduced to New Zealand
- Scarlet tanager, unsuccessfully introduced to Tahiti
- Silver-beaked tanager, unsuccessfully introduced to Tahiti
- Brazilian tanager, unsuccessfully introduced to Tahiti
- Crimson-backed tanager, successfully introduced to Tahiti
- Blue-gray tanager, successfully introduced to Peru; unsuccessfully introduced to the United States and Tahiti
- Golden tanager, unsuccessfully introduced to Tahiti
- Masked tanager, unsuccessfully introduced to Tahiti
- Red-legged honeycreeper, probably introduced successfully to Cuba; unsuccessfully introduced to Tahiti

=== Emberizidae ===
- Yellowhammer, successfully introduced to New Zealand; unsuccessfully introduced to Australia and the United States
- Ortolan bunting, unsuccessfully introduced to New Zealand and Australia
- Cirl bunting, successfully introduced to New Zealand
- Reed bunting, unsuccessfully introduced to New Zealand
- Rufous-collared sparrow, unsuccessfully introduced to the Falkland Islands
- Common diuca-finch, successfully introduced to Easter Island
- Saffron finch, successfully introduced to Jamaica, Panama, the Hawaiian Islands and probably Tobago
- Grassland yellow-finch, successfully introduced to Barbados, from whence it has colonised several other West Indies islands
- White-collared seedeater, unsuccessfully introduced to Cuba
- Cuban grassquit, successfully introduced to New Providence in the Bahamas
- Yellow-faced grassquit, successfully introduced to the Hawaiian Islands; successfully possibly introduced to New Providence in the Bahamas
- Puerto Rican bullfinch, introduced (status unknown) to the island of St John in the Virgin Islands
- Yellow cardinal, unsuccessfully introduced to the Hawaiian Islands
- Red-crested cardinal, successfully introduced to the Hawaiian Islands and Japan, and possibly South Africa and the United States
- Red-cowled cardinal, unsuccessfully introduced to the Hawaiian Islands
- Red-capped cardinal, unsuccessfully introduced to the Hawaiian Islands
- Yellow-billed cardinal, successfully introduced to the Hawaiian Islands

=== Cardinalidae ===
- Northern cardinal, successfully introduced to California, the Hawaiian Islands and Bermuda; unsuccessfully introduced to Tahiti and Australia
- Indigo bunting, unsuccessfully introduced to the Hawaiian Islands
- Painted bunting, unsuccessfully introduced to the Hawaiian Islands
- Orange-breasted bunting, unsuccessfully introduced to the Hawaiian Islands

=== Icteridae ===
- Spot-breasted oriole, successfully introduced to Florida
- Troupial, successfully introduced to Puerto Rico and St Thomas in the Virgin Islands; unsuccessfully introduced to Jamaica, Trinidad, Antigua, Dominica and Grenada, where all are probably aviary escapees
- Yellow-hooded blackbird, introduced, perhaps successfully, around Lima in Peru
- Red-breasted meadowlark, unsuccessfully introduced to Easter Island
- Long-tailed meadowlark, unsuccessfully introduced to the Hawaiian Islands
- Western meadowlark, successfully introduced to the Hawaiian Islands; possibly unsuccessfully introduced to New Zealand
- Carib grackle, successfully introduced to Antigua and Barbuda, St Kitts and Saint Martin in the Netherlands Antilles, and possibly Tobago
- Shiny cowbird, its range has extended to Chile, the Caribbean and North America mostly naturally but facilitated through pet trade

== See also ==
- Avian range expansion
- Introduced species
- List of bird species introduced to the Hawaiian Islands
- List of introduced mammal species
- List of introduced species
- List of non-native birds of Great Britain
