= Invasive species in Hawaii =

Negative impact to natural biodiversity

As with a number of other geographically isolated islands, Hawaii has problems with invasive species negatively affecting the natural biodiversity of the islands.

== Historical examples ==
A herd of axis deer in Maui

Hawaii is the most isolated major land mass in the world and that isolation has led to very high rates of endemism. Uniquely adapted endemic species are often sensitive to competition from invasive species and Hawaii has had numerous extinctions (List of extinct animals of the Hawaiian Islands). While not the only cause, introduction of invasive species can be a major cause of population decline and extinction.

There are several routes for introduction of non-native species. Some species were accidentally introduced to Hawaii like the rat, fire ants, coqui frog, mosquitos, and coconut rhinoceros beetle. Some are species brought in for cultivation that spread to wild areas like miconia, pigs, and goats. Some species were intentionally introduced for sport like axis deer and some for pest control like mongoose or cane toad.

The mongoose was introduced to Hawaii in the late-19th century in an attempt to control the large rat population in the sugar cane fields. However, since then, the mongoose population has grown to large numbers without controlling the rat population and has greatly diminished the population of native ground nesting birds, snails, and palms.

Another example of an invasive species introduced in the 19th century is the fire tree, which is a small shrub that was brought from the Azores, Madeira, and the Canary Islands as an ornamental plant or for firewood. However, now it poses a serious threat to native plants on young volcanic sites, lowland forests, and shrublands, where it forms dense monocultural stands Another plant, the strawberry guava, was introduced in the early 19th century as an edible fruit. However, it now poses a major threat to Hawaii's rare endemic flora and fauna by forming shade-casting thickets with dense mats of surface feeder roots.

== Potential harm from invasive species ==
Invasive species threaten biodiversity by causing disease, acting as predators or parasites, acting as competitors, altering habitat, or hybridizing with local species.

=== Disease ===
Invasive species often carry new diseases for native species. For example, the biting fly in Hawaii are small, even tiny, and include many species, some of which are vectors of diseases while others bite and cause considerable nuisance and health-related problems. The introduction of mosquitoes to Hawaii has resulted in the spread of avian malaria, and increases the risk of dengue and west Nile virus (not known to be in Hawaii yet).

Other native species can be affected by invasive species diseases as well, such as the once-dominant koa tree being killed by koa wilt, which is believed to have been brought into Hawaii on an ornamental acacia plant, and the 'ohi'a tree, now being affected by Rapid Ohia Death.

=== Predators ===
Invasive predators can severely reduce the population sizes of native species, or even drive them extinct, because native prey species may not have evolved defenses against the novel predators.

=== Competition ===
Oftentimes the introduced species is better equipped to survive and competes with the native species for food or other resources. For example, the strawberry guava tree is one of Hawaii's worst invasive species. It is dangerous because it crowds out native plant species, breaks up natural areas, disrupts native animal communities, alters native ecosystem processes like water production, and provides refuge for alien fruit flies that are a major pest of Hawaiian agriculture.

=== Habitat alteration ===
Invasive species can change the state of an environment in many ways based on how they feed and interact with their new surroundings. These interactions along with competition can limit the amount and type of resources for native species.

=== Hybridization ===
Hybridization occurs when members of two different species mate with one another and produce viable offspring that carry genes from both parents. When an invasive species is much more abundant than a native relative, they may hybridize so often that the invaders genes "flood" the native species, such that no individuals contain the entire genotype of the native species, thus effectively driving the native species to extinction. For example, hybridization between Introduced mallards and the native Hawaiian duck (koloa maoli) and between the rarest European duck (the white-headed duck) and the invasive North American ruddy duck may result in the extinction of the native species.

=== Cultural Practice Impacts ===
In Hawaii, the Hawaiian culture is closely connected to its environment and native species. Chants, ceremonies, hula, and other practices involve the use of plants (both native and Polynesian-introduced), traditional access to places of importance, and other activities that can be directly affected by invasive species. For example, taro (kalo, in Hawaiian) is defined in the Hawaiian Creation Chant as the plant from which Hawaiians were formed and is considered a sacred plant. The introduction of the golden apple snail, which attacks taro, threatens the very existence of Hawaiian ancestors.

== Threats to Hawaii's ecosystems ==
Hawaii has a growing invasive species crisis affecting the islands' endangered plants and animals, overall environmental and human health, and the viability of its tourism and agriculture-based economy. Invasive species occur globally, but Hawaii is more susceptible to invasive species because they are islands. The entire island chain of Hawaii has been devastated by invasive insects, plants, hoofed animals such as deer, goats, pigs and other pests. Feral pigs eat endangered birds' eggs and trample fragile native plants, rosy wolfsnails from Florida gorge themselves on the islands' native snails, weeds such as Australian tree fern and Miconia calvescens plants shade out native plants, and coqui tree frogs aggravate tourists, eat native insects and decrease home values with their piercing calls.

=== Invasive aquatic species ===
The threat of invasive species to Hawaii's coral reefs is very concerning. Hawaii's economy relies on their coral reefs for an estimate $10 million tourism business. Freshwater invasive species also threaten Hawaii's ecosystems. In 2003 Lake Wilson was invaded with the floating water fern Salvinia. The invasive fern competed with native species and fish. It has cost the state over $1 million to clean up the lake.

Freshwater fish have also spread. Due to sport fishermen, species like trout, bass, and other fish have been introduced to lakes and streams in Hawaii. Also, people released pet fish like guppies, suckermouth catfish, and swordtails in local bodies of water. The suckermouth catfish burrow into the ground, thus harming the local wildlife. Even seemingly harmless guppies can spread disease to native gobies.

=== Invasive insects & arachnids ===
Insects can have major impacts on Hawaii's ecology, crops, and human health. Populations of introduced little fire ants in Hawaii can have major negative impacts on animals, crops, and humans. These small ants can provide a painful sting and are known to attack in swarms. Little fire ants are native to Central and South America, they were introduced to Hawaii on imported plants.

A major threat to Hawaiian crops is the coffee berry borer. It has been known to destroy entire crops of coffee, but some farmers have been able to fight off these pests with pesticides and other measures, while others are finding that the borer is developing resistance to pesticides. It is not known at this time exactly how the pest was introduced to Hawaii but Hawaii's Department of Agriculture in cooperation with the University of Hawaii are investigating how the species arrived to Hawaii and how it can be eradicated.

The coconut rhinoceros beetle or Asiatic rhinoceros beetle was first detected in Hawaii on the golf course at Joint Base Pearl Harbor in December 2013. This large beetle feeds on the growing shoots at the tops of coconut trees damaging the emerging leaves and providing opportunities for infection with plant pathogens. The Hawaii Department of Agriculture, USDA, and University of Hawaii are actively working on eradicating the beetle.

Another insect that is threatening Hawaii's economy is the small hive beetle, which has been destroying bee hives and honey production throughout the islands. The infestation does not only harm commercial honey production but also wild bee populations and their ability to pollinate plants. This could lead to major ecological problems if current trends are not reverted. In Hawaii, the brown widow spider has also been established, along with the brown violin spider, Asian spinyback spider, and the pale leaf spider. The spiders snuck on bananas from tropical regions to get to Hawaii.

=== Invasive terrestrial chordates ===
Terrestrially, invasive species are proving to be a major difficulty in Hawaii because the islands lack many natural predators of invasive animals. Invasive predators often move to the top of the food chain and disrupt prey populations, particularly small mammals, birds, insects, and plants.

The veiled chameleon and the Jackson's chameleon have also been found in Hawaii. They originally came to Hawaii through the pet trade in the 1970s despite Hawaii's laws against the importing or transporting of chameleons, lizards or snakes. Jackson's and veiled chameleons eat mostly insects but also leaves, flowers, small mammals and birds. Hawaii's ecosystems are especially damaged by chameleons hunting and eating patterns, lack of natural predators, and ability to adapt to the various conditions throughout Hawaii. They have a great impact on the ecology of Hawaii. Another threat to Hawaii's ecosystems is a frog called the coqui frog. It makes loud noises, eats native bugs, and is a potential food source for the brown tree snake.

Hawaii is also aggressively fighting to prevent the invasion of the brown tree snake. The snake has caused major economic and ecological problems in Guam. The snake has destroyed bird, bat, and lizard populations and caused several human disruptions including large numbers of snake bites and power outages from climbing electrical wires. It is estimated that if the species gets into Hawaii it could cost Hawaii up to $123 million. There is a great fear that the species will be transported to Hawaii from Guamanian ships and have the same impact on Hawaii. Isolated numbers of brown snakes have already been recorded on or around cargo ships into Hawaii.

The feral pig is also a major threat to Hawaii's natural ecology. Feral pigs that were originally released or escaped from farms have been breeding in the wild and creating a large population of wild pigs in Hawaii. They have major impacts on the ecology because they are very destructive of plants and habitat and lack predators. Their burrowing patterns also destroy bird nesting grounds and lead to erosion. In remote, mountainous areas, they destroy the nests of seabirds including Newell's shearwater (Puffinus newelli) and Hawaiian petrel (Pterodroma sandwichensis). These burrows also create standing pools of feces infested water that serve as ideal breeding grounds for mosquitoes. Many native Hawaiian birds are dying because of diseases transmitted by increasing numbers of mosquitoes.

== Economic impact ==
The economic impact of allowing Invasive species to continue to propagate and spread throughout Hawaii poses severe risks for various Hawaiian industries central to the state's economy. According to a Legislative State Reference Bureau study from 2002, snails, insects and viruses that are nonnative have threatened the resurgence of the taro root crops which is an estimated 2 million dollar industry in the state. The taro aphid, which attacks plants in dry land taro crops, causes a 90% crop loss rate, devastating local farmers. The only way to effectively combat an infestation of invasive pest species is to remove all taro root from the area for one year further exacerbating the economic impact of the pest. The papaya industry, which comprises the 5th largest commodity in the state and takes in 16 million dollars annually, has also been affected by invasive species. The Papaya ringspot virus has killed trees and ruins marketable fruit. Furthermore, with the introduction of fruit flies to Hawaii, fruit fly-free markets like Japan and California have restricted trade thus cutting off an estimated 300 million dollars of potential markets.

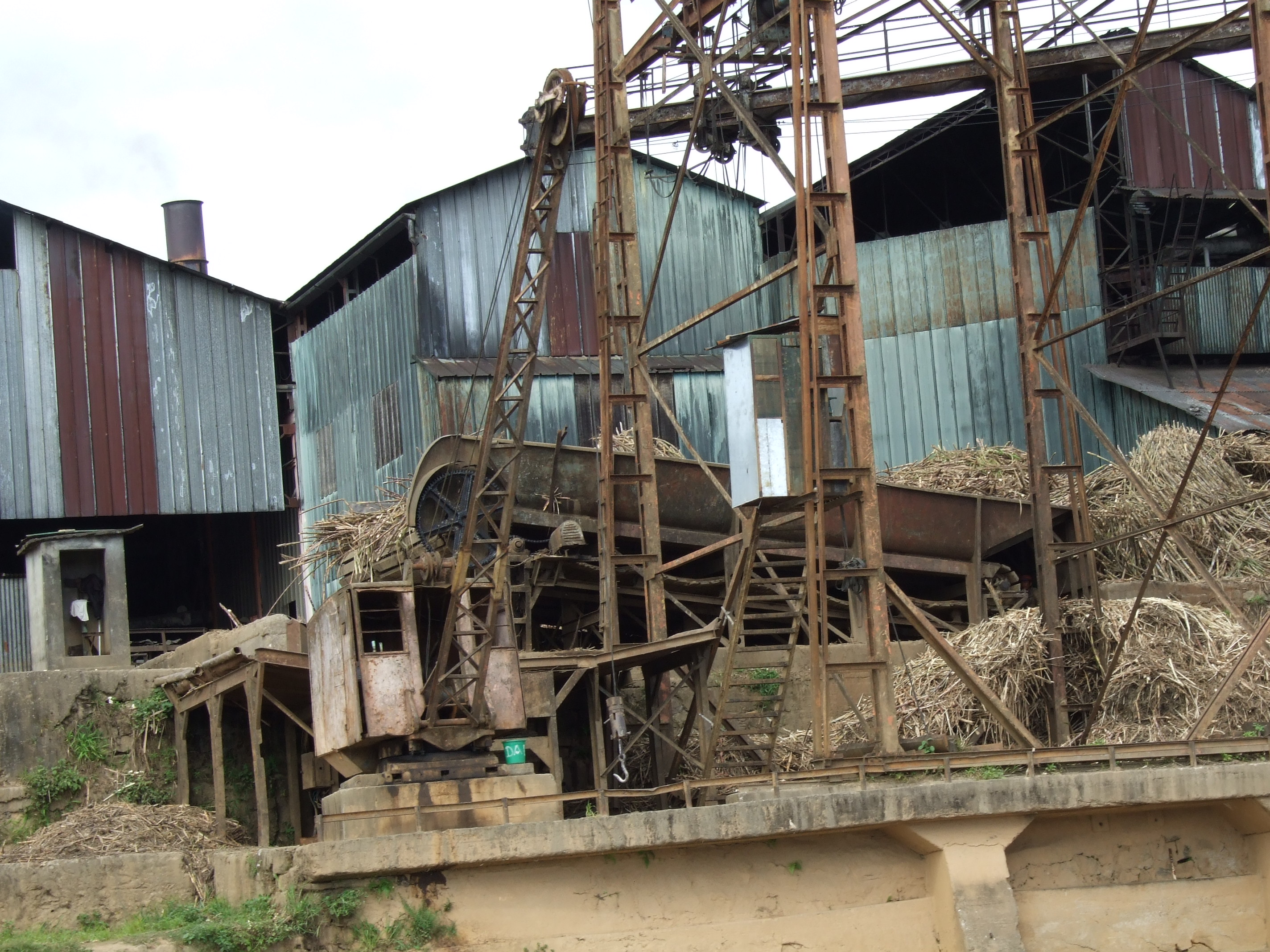
Sugarcane processing facility

Since 1985, four varieties of insect pests have attacked the sugar cane industry and cost farmers more than 9 million dollars. Rats and rodents have also attacked sugar cane crops throughout the islands causing between 6 and 10 million dollars in damages annually in the 1990s. In addition, invasive rats and rodents consume approximately 5-10% of the lucrative macadamia nut crop causing "1.8 – 3.6 million dollars of direct agricultural damages" to the industry. Mongooses were introduced to the island in the late 19th century as a way to control rodent populations. Since then, the mongoose has failed to effectively control rat populations while driving native birds and insects to extinction and preying on local poultry. This is an example of the difficulty of combating invasive species as seemingly quick and cost effective solutions have complicated effects on the local ecosystem. Another example was the introduction of the Indian myna, an animal meant to combat the spread of sugar cane eating worms. An unforeseen consequence of this introduction has been the introduction and rapid spread of seeds of an invasive weed, the Lantana camara.

Thus, considering the potential economic harm illustrated in the examples above, the problem of combating invasive species is a "recurring legislative concern." In order to eradicate the threats of current invasive species and to understand the risks of new invasive species, the legislature would need approximately 50 million dollars in funding annually. Currently, funding to battle invasive species is only 10-15% of needed levels with an additional 6% being contributed by federal sources. Considering the elevated costs, particularly in the depressed economy, government should focus on ongoing funding from dedicated sources as well as concentrating on prevention.

== The Hawaii Invasive Species Council ==
In response to the 2002 state legislature reference bureau report, which identified the gaps in invasive species action funding and the risks posed by invasive species, the Hawaii Invasive Species Council (HISC) was formed. The HISC is co-chaired by the Department of Land and Natural Resources and the Department of Agriculture and also includes the membership of the University of Hawaii, the Hawaiian Department of Business and Economic Development and Tourism, the Hawaii Department of Health and the Hawaii Department of Transportation. The HISC is composed of five working groups chaired by member agencies dealing with prevention, established pest management, public awareness, research and technology and natural resources. The HISC provides "policy level direction, coordination and planning among state departments, federal agencies and international and local initiatives for the control and eradication of invasive species." The HISC seeks to "maintain a comprehensive overview of issues and supports state wide invasive species prevention, early detection and control programs" in the effort to provide a testing ground for innovation in methods and capacity to address invasive species which can be adopted permanently by other funded agencies.

HISC partners and major funding recipients include the Island Invasive Species Committees (ISCs). These grant-funded Committees leverage HISC funding with Federal, other state, county, and private funding to address priority invasive species that threaten their county (island). The ISCs are partnerships between government agencies (Federal, State, and County), nongovernment agencies, private business, and local landowners. Each committee (KISC, OISC, MISC, MoMISC, and BIISC) focuses on protecting their island from invasive pests by utilizing prevention, early detection, rapid response, and control methodology supported by a paid staff and field crew. The goal of the ISCs is to protect agriculture, valuable watersheds, human health and quality of life, Hawaiian cultural practices, and Hawaii's unique biodiversity.

Currently, funding for the HISC is under 4 million dollars following a 50% state funding reduction due to tightening budget from poor economic conditions. The promised 2 million dollars for the program in the current state budget is also subject to reduction pending budget shortfalls in the state treasury which could further affect the effort to combat invasive species in the state.

== See also ==
List of invasive plant species in Hawaii

- Invasive species in the United States
- Japanese white-eye in Hawaii
