= List of bird species introduced to the Hawaiian Islands =

This list of bird species introduced to the Hawaiian Islands includes only those species known to have established self-sustaining breeding populations as a direct or indirect result of human intervention. A complete list of all non-native species ever imported to the islands, including those that never became established, would be much longer. In the following list, ^ indicates a species indigenous to the Hawaiian Islands but introduced to an area or areas outside its known native range, * indicates a formerly established population that is now extirpated, and parenthetical notes describe the specific islands where each species is known to be established.

- Western cattle egret (most of the larger islands)
- Mallard (throughout)
- Wild turkey (Hawaii, Lanai, Maui, Molokai, and Niihau)
- California quail
- Gambel's quail (Lanai and Kahoolawe)
- Chukar partridge (all main islands from Kauai eastward, except Oahu)
- Black francolin (Hawaii, Kauai, Maui, and Molokai; possibly extirpated)
- Grey francolin (Hawaii, Lanai, Maui, Molokai, and Oahu)
- Erckel's spurfowl (all main islands from Kauai eastward, except Maui)
- Red junglefowl (Kauai, Oahu, and Maui)
- Kalij pheasant (Hawaii)
- Common pheasant (all main islands from Kauai eastward)
- Green pheasant (Lanai and Kauai; possibly Maui)
- Indian peafowl (Hawaii, Maui, and Oahu)
- Chestnut-bellied sandgrouse (Hawaii)
- Rock dove (Hawaii, Maui, Oahu)
- Spotted dove (all main islands from Kauai eastward)
- Zebra dove (all main islands from Kauai eastward)
- Mourning dove (Hawaii, Maui)
- Rose-ringed parakeet (Hawaii, Oahu, and Kauai)
- Mitred parakeet (Hawaii)
- Red-masked parakeet (Hawaii, O'ahu)
- Red-crowned amazon (O'ahu)
- American barn owl (all main islands from Kauai eastward)
- Mariana swiftlet (Oahu)
- Eurasian skylark (All main islands)
- Red-vented bulbul (O'ahu)
- Red-whiskered bulbul (O'ahu)
- Japanese bush warbler (All main islands)
- White-rumped shama (All main islands)
- Greater necklaced laughingthrush (Kauai)
- Chinese Hwamei (All main islands)
- Red-billed leiothrix (Hawaii, Maui, O'ahu)
- Warbling white-eye (Hawaii, Maui, Kauai, see Japanese white-eye in Hawaii)
- Northern mockingbird (All main islands)
- Common myna (All main islands)
- Yellow-faced grassquit (O'ahu)
- Saffron finch (Hawaiʻi)
- Red-crested cardinal (Oahu, Maui, Kauai)
- Yellow-billed cardinal (Hawaii)
- Northern cardinal (All main islands)
- Western meadowlark (Kaua'i)
- House finch (All main islands)
- Atlantic canary
- Yellow-fronted canary (O'ahu, Hawaii)
- Laysan finch^ (Pearl and Hermes Reef*)
- House sparrow (All main islands)
- Red-cheeked cordon-bleu (Hawaii)
- Lavender waxbill (Hawaii, O'ahu)
- Orange-cheeked waxbill (Maui, O'ahu)
- Black-rumped waxbill (Hawaii)
- Common waxbill (All main islands)
- Red avadavat (Kauai, O'ahu)
- African silverbill (All main islands)
- Scaly-breasted munia (All main islands)
- Chestnut munia (All main islands)
- Java sparrow (Maui, Kauai, Hawaii)
- Cedar waxwing (Maui)

== See also ==
- Endemic birds of Hawaii
- List of introduced bird species
- List of introduced species
- Introduced species
- List of invasive species
- Invasive species

== Sources ==
- American Ornithologists' Union. 1998. Check-list of North American Birds. 7th edition. American Ornithologists' Union, Washington, D.C. 829 pp.
- Berger, Andrew J. 1981. Hawaiian birdlife. 2nd edition. University of Hawaii Press, Honolulu. 260 pp.
- Long, John L. 1971. Introduced birds of the world: the worldwide history, distribution, and influence of birds introduced to new environments. Universe Books, New York. 528 pp.
