= List of non-native birds in Great Britain =

Since the Victorian era many bird species have been introduced to Britain, whether for sport, ornament or general experimenting, and some have established themselves whilst others have not. Others have escaped from captivity and established themselves, though many species either die out after a few years or die off in harsh weather. This page lists the bird species that have established colonies in the British Isles. Some non-native birds have established themselves and become naturalised after naturally migrating to the country and forming colonies, such as the collared dove. The list below comprises all those bird species which have occurred in a wild state in Great Britain.

Escaped birds of certain species, e.g. ruddy shelduck, can cause confusion amongst birdwatchers as they occasionally occur in Britain as wild birds.

The following species have established colonies in the UK at some point in time. They may have since died out, or new colonies established elsewhere.

- Black-crowned night heron: Since 1951, a free flying colony of the American race has existed at Edinburgh Zoo, Scotland, although the zoo now has a policy of not releasing free winged birds. There is also a similar colony at Great Witchingham, Norfolk.
- Black swan: One of the commonest of escaped waterfowl, individual birds/pairs can be encountered on almost any body of water and several pairs breed annually, though so far no permanent colonies have become established.
- White-fronted goose: Wild birds do not breed in the UK. A small breeding population on Islay in Scotland stems from a wildfowl collection; feral birds may be encountered occasionally amongst flocks of other geese.
- Domestic goose: Common farmyard escapee. Can be encountered anywhere, and breeds readily with the greylag goose, as the former is a subspecies of the latter.
- Bar-headed goose: Can be seen in scattered localities, about 15 pairs now breed.
- Snow goose: Appears as a wild bird in Scotland annually, those seen in summer are escapes. A small population moves between the islands of Coll and Mull in the Scottish Inner Hebrides. There are also scattered birds elsewhere.
- Emperor goose: An occasional escapee which may be encountered amongst flocks of feral geese, but they have bred at Walney Island and in Essex.
- Swan goose: The domesticated version of this bird, commonly known as the Chinese goose, is a common farmyard escapee and can be found on small ponds throughout the country. "True" swan goose is an infrequent escape, individuals or small parties may occasionally be encountered within feral flocks of Canada geese etc.
- Canada goose: First introduced in the 17th century, this bird has now spread throughout the country and is abundant throughout its range. Large flocks, often numbering several hundred birds, are a feature of many man-made waterways where truly "wild" geese are generally absent.
- Barnacle goose: A population of feral birds now exists in southern England, with strong populations in East Anglia, Lincolnshire, East Riding of Yorkshire, Bedfordshire, Gloucestershire and Hampshire. These birds are largely resident (wild barnacle geese are winter visitors to parts of Scotland and Ireland) and breeding is frequent. Away from these strongholds, individual feral and escaped birds often join flocks of their far more abundant relative, the Canada goose
- Egyptian goose: A population was first introduced in the 17th century, and historically, free-flying flocks were established on private estates in North Norfolk, Devon, Bedfordshire and East Lothian. They are now common in Norfolk and have spread west, as far as Rutland Water.
- Ruddy shelduck: Birds are widely reported from all across Britain, especially Norfolk and south-western England, although confirmed breeding is unusual. Wild ruddy shelducks certainly occurred in Britain during the 19th century and early 20th century and some records, especially in late summer, may still refer to genuine vagrants from breeding areas in southern & south-eastern Europe and North Africa (or wanderers from feral colonies across the North Sea)
- Muscovy duck: A common escapee, frequent on town park lakes or anywhere ducks gather to be fed by humans, breeding pairs can be found on scattered waterways all across the country; a well-established colony exists in Cambridgeshire. These birds are of the domesticated form, differing from the wild South American Muscovy by showing varying amounts of white in their otherwise black plumage.
- Domesticated duck: The quintessential "farmyard duck" and domesticated form of the Mallard, examples in varying plumages can be found on almost any urban waterway. They will breed readily with genuinely wild mallards (in scientific terms, they are the same species and ultimately revert to the standard colouration).
- Wood or Carolina duck: A small population formerly existed in Bedfordshire, it has now declined. In addition can be found breeding at other favoured sites in southern England, though individual escaped/feral birds are more frequent. Is also a potential vagrant from North America; care should be taken especially with birds sighted in south-western England and Ireland
- Mandarin duck: This Eastern Asian species was introduced as an ornamental bird, with escapes and deliberate releases resulting in a large and expanding population. Most numerous in the Home Counties but can also be found around Norfolk, Rutland Water, the River Severn, and southern Scotland.
- Ruddy duck: Introduced to Gloucestershire in the 1950s as a result of escapees from Slimbridge Wildfowl Trust, spread rapidly over central England, now subject to eradication program due to the fact that it threatens the white-headed duck in Europe.
- Red-crested pochard: A population has become established in scattered areas across southern England, with a well-established breeding colony in the Cotswold Water Park, Gloucestershire/Wiltshire:
- Bobwhite quail: Introduced as game bird to many areas; colonies became established in Suffolk and the Isles of Scilly, now rarely reported.
- Red-legged partridge: Introduced as a game bird in the 18th century, now common over much of England as far north as Scotland, and still regularly released for shooting.
- Chukar: Introduced many times for shooting in the past, and regularly hybridised with red-legged partridge until releases of both chukars and hybrids were banned in 1992. Now very rare if not extinct.
- Reeves's pheasant: Introduced in the 19th century to Bedfordshire and Inverness-shire, but birds later died out, released for shooting up to the present day, and individuals may be found by chance all over the UK. Has been especially frequently reported in Norfolk over recent years.
- Silver pheasant: Introduced several times for use as a game bird and for ornament, but failed to naturalise. Reported occasionally.
- Green pheasant: Introduced for game shooting purposes, readily hybridises with common pheasant. Releases continue to this day and breeding has been speculated upon, though not proven, in Norfolk
- Common pheasant: First introduced as long ago as Roman times, now abundant all over apart from in cities and on the highest ground. Many millions released each year for shooting.
- Golden pheasant: Introduced to many areas for ornament and as a game bird. Can be encountered anywhere, but is declining as a breeding bird; stronghold remains the Breckland of Norfolk, with populations persisting on Anglesey, in Dumfries and Galloway and on Brownsea Island, Dorset

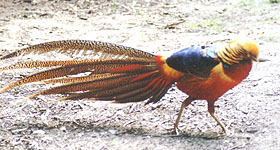
Golden pheasant are one of many game birds introduced for sport and ornamental purposes.

- Lady Amherst's pheasant: Introduced for shooting and ornament, but now the small population is confined to Bedfordshire (and is all but extinct). May be found elsewhere from time to time.
- Indian peafowl: Free ranging birds have escaped and bred on occasion, as has happened in Norfolk, Nottinghamshire and Worcestershire.
- Helmeted guineafowl: Birds may stray from farms into the surrounding countryside, and have bred on occasion. Others may just wander during the daytime, to return to the safety of the farm at night.
- Feral Pigeon: Descendants of escaped (and released) domesticated rock doves—one of very few truly feral species.
- Barbary dove: Cagebird escapes have bred, current status confused by the very similar collared dove.
- Alexandrine parakeet: This bird, very similar to the ring-necked parakeet, is a frequent escape and has bred in the past.
- Ring-necked parakeet: Introduced in the 1960s, now widespread in south-east England and flocks of several thousand gather to roost at sites in Kent, Surrey and Greater London. A bird which has readily adapted to urban gardens, being a frequent visitor to feeding stations, it is now spreading outside of its current range, being able to tolerate the cold winters of the British Isles. The British birds are sometimes referred to as Kingston parakeets.
- Blue-crowned parakeet: Escapees have bred in Southern England.
- Monk parakeet: Several colonies have formed in recent years, notably in Hertfordshire and Surrey.
- Budgerigar: Formerly several populations present, including a notable one on the Isles of Scilly which lasted many years. Now only likely to be encountered as an escapee, of which it is one of the most frequent.
- Eurasian eagle owl: A famous pair have set up residence in North Yorkshire, and have sparked large media interest. Their status is unknown, as to whether they are escapees or wild birds; other reports, similarly of unknown origin, are occasionally received from wide-ranging localities.
- Little owl: First recorded in 1842 in Yorkshire, it is now well established throughout England and Wales.
- Red-winged laughingthrush: One escaped pair of this bird bred on the Isle of Man. However, as of 2019 this population is believed to be extinct.
- Yellow-fronted canary: Cage bird escapes on occasion, though they often do not last long in British climate.
- Domestic canary: Escapes have survived for some time in the wild, though they are not thought to have bred.
- Common waxbill: Cagebird escapes of several species from time to time.
- Zebra finch: This bird is extremely common in aviculture, and is a very productive breeder. Small colonies may set up from time to time after a multiple escape, but they rarely last long.
- Red-billed leiothrix: A brightly coloured subtropical songbird from Southern Asia, most sightings originate from Wiltshire and Somerset. These birds nest communally, so they can breed in high densities.

In addition to the species listed below, almost any bird kept in captivity (especially wildfowl) may escape and their origins may not always be obvious. Excluding the likelihood of captive origin is a major hurdle to be faced by the British Birds Rarities Committee when assessing reports of rare and vagrant species to Britain.

== See also ==
- List of introduced bird species
- Invasive species in the British Isles
