= Suckermouth catfish =

Suckermouth catfish may refer to:

- Any species of armored catfish (family Loricariidae), most notably:
  - Hypostomus plecostomus, and Hypostomus punctatus, two species of armored catfish popular with aquarists
  - Any similar species marketed under the name "plecostomus" or "pleco"
  - Sailfin catfish (disambiguation), usually Pterygoplichthys gibbiceps
