= List of introduced mammal species =

Stump-tailed macaque

This list of introduced mammal species includes all the species of mammal introduced to an area without regard to that territory being or not being their native area of occupation or the success of that re-introduction or introduction to the area. This practice has been harmful in many areas, although some introductions are made with the aim of preserving mammal species. Following the name of the mammal, a brief description of where they were introduced is included.

== Marsupials ==
- Bennett's wallaby successfully introduced to Europe and New Zealand
- Brush-tailed possum successfully introduced to New Zealand
- Brush-tailed rock wallaby unsuccessfully introduced to New Zealand (exterminated by 2014) but was successfully introduced to Hawaii
- Koala successfully introduced to South Australia
- Parma wallaby (Macropus parma) successfully introduced to New Zealand
- Swamp wallaby (Wallabia bicolor) successfully introduced to New Zealand
- Tammar wallaby successfully introduced to New Zealand
- Virginia opossum (Didelphis virginiana) successfully introduced to California and unsuccessfully introduced to British Isles (no wild population exists)

== Horses ==
- Feral donkey successfully introduced to Australia, Africa, USA, Cyprus, New Zealand, Central America, Sri Lanka, Oceania
- Feral horse successfully introduced to USA, Australia, New Zealand, Africa, British isles, Central America, and South America
- Plains zebra successfully introduced to USA

== Antelopes ==
- Blackbuck successfully introduced to USA and South America
- Black wildebeest (Connochaetes gnou) successfully introduced to Namibia
- Gemsbok successfully introduced to USA
- Impala (Aepyceros melampus) successfully introduced to Gabon
- Nilgai successfully introduced to USA and Mexico
- Nyala (Tragelaphus angasii) successfully introduced to Botswana and Namibia
- Sable antelope (Hippotragus niger) successfully introduced to Swaziland

== Pigs ==
- Wild boar successfully introduced to USA, Hawaii, Australia, Africa, South America, New Zealand, Central America, Asia, and Oceania

== Cattle and other bovines ==
- American bison (Bison bison) successfully introduced to California
- Banteng successfully introduced to Australia
- Domestic cattle successfully introduced worldwide
- European bison (Bison bonasus) successfully reintroduced to Europe
- Greenland muskox (Ovibox moschatus) successfully introduced to Scandinavia and Russia
- Water buffalo successfully introduced to Australia, Brazil, and Oceania
- Zebu successfully introduced to Africa - considered to be a breed of domestic cattle

== Camels ==
- Dromedary camel successfully introduced to Europe (no wild population exists), Asia (all wild populations exist within the natural range), and Australia, and unsuccessfully introduced to USA (due to the Civil War but captive only)
- Bactrian camel successfully introduced to Europe (no wild population exists)

== Sheep and Goats ==
- Barbary sheep successfully introduced to New Mexico, Europe, Mexico, and Canary Islands
- Chamois successfully introduced to New Zealand
- Feral goat/Wild goat successfully introduced to Australia, New Zealand, Hawaii, Africa, North America, British isles, South America, Europe, Asia, and Oceania
- Feral sheep successfully introduced to USA, New Zealand, Tibet, and Oceania
- Himalayan tahr successfully introduced to USA, South America, New Zealand, and Africa
- Mouflon successfully introduced to USA, mainland Europe, South America (on private estates), Hawaii, and Canary Islands

== Hippos ==
- Hippopotamus successfully introduced to Colombia following Pablo Escobar's death and subsequent closure of his private zoo in 1993.

== Deer ==
- Moose introduced to Newfoundland, possibly successfully introduced to New Zealand (no wild population exists but captive only)
- White-tailed deer successfully introduced to New Zealand, Cuba, Jamaica, Hispaniola, Puerto Rico, Bahamas, Lesser Antilles, Finland, Czech Republic and Serbia
- Mule deer unsuccessfully introduced to Argentina and Hawaii
- American elk successfully introduced to Florida, New Zealand, South America, and Italy
- Chital deer successfully introduced to Hawaii, Australia, Chile, Argentina, Texas, Florida, Mississippi, California, Alabama, and Europe
- Fallow deer successfully introduced to Australia, New Zealand, British Isles, North America, Caribbean Islands, South America, and Africa
- Sika deer successfully introduced to Europe, British Isles, Africa (captive only), North America, South America (captive only), and New Zealand
- Red deer successfully introduced to North America, Australia, New Zealand, South America, and Africa
- Chinese water deer successfully introduced to British Isles and France
- Reeve's muntjac successfully introduced to British Isles and Asia
- Indian hog deer unsuccessfully introduced to USA and Australia
- Swamp deer successfully introduced to Texas (captive only)
- Rangifer tarandus (reindeer) successfully introduced to Iceland, South Georgia, and Ile Australia
- Rusa marianna (Philippine deer) successfully introduced to Guam, Rota, Pohnpei and Saipan
- Rusa timorensis (Javan rusa) successfully introduced to Australia, New Zealand, and Africa
- Rusa unicolor (sambar deer) successfully introduced to Australia, New Zealand, and North America

== Mongooses and relatives ==
- Common genet successfully introduced to Europe and unsuccessfully introduced to most of Egypt
- Small Asian mongoose successfully introduced to Hawaii, Venezuela, Guyana, Suriname, mainland Europe, Caribbean Islands, Japan, Mauritius, and Fiji and unsuccessfully introduced to British Isles (no wild population exists)
- Yellow mongoose successfully introduced to Namibia and South Africa, but not outside of its natural range
- Egyptian mongoose successfully introduced to Europe
- Paguma larvata (masked palm civet) successfully introduced to Japan
- Viverricula indica (small Indian civet) successfully introduced to Madagascar

== Cats ==
- Feral cat successfully introduced to worldwide, including New Zealand, Hawaii, and others
- Puma yagouaroundi (jaguarundi) successfully introduced to Florida

== Dogs ==
- Feral dog successfully introduced to worldwide
- Red fox successfully introduced to worldwide, including Australia
- Raccoon dog successfully introduced to Europe and Asia
- Canis latrans (coyote) successfully introduced to Florida and Georgia

== Mustelids ==
- American mink successfully introduced to Asia and the British Isles, South America, and Europe
- Ferret successfully introduced to the British Isles, New Zealand, and Azores
- Stoat successfully introduced to New Zealand
- Martes melampus (Japanese marten) successfully introduced to Asia
- Mustela itatsi (Japanese weasel) successfully introduced to Asia
- Mustela nivalis (least weasel) successfully introduced to New Zealand
- Mustela sibirica (Siberian weasel) successfully introduced to Asia

== Raccoons and relatives ==
- South American coati unsuccessfully introduced to Europe
- Nasua narica (white-nosed coati) successfully introduced to Florida
- Common raccoon successfully introduced to Japan, Europe, Prince Edward Island, and Caribbean Islands

== Insectivores ==
- Asian house shrew successfully introduced to Africa and Oceania
- Atelerix algirus (north African hedgehog) successfully introduced to Europe
- Crocidura russula (greater white-toothed shrew) successfully introduced to British isles
- Erinaceus amurensis (Amur hedgehog) successfully introduced to Japan
- Erinaceus europaeus (European hedgehog) successfully introduced to British isles and New Zealand

== Monkeys ==
- Barbary macaque successfully introduced to Europe
- Rhesus macaque successfully introduced to Florida, South Carolina, the Caribbean islands, and Japan
- Japanese macaque unsuccessfully introduced to Texas
- Wedge-capped capuchin introduced to Trinidad & Tobago
- Brown capuchin introduced to Trinidad and Tobago
- Vervet monkey successfully introduced to USA Florida
- Patas monkey successfully introduced to Australia (captive only) and Puerto Rico
- Common squirrel monkey successfully introduced to Florida
- Crab-eating macaque successfully introduced to Africa, Hong Kong, and Oceania
- Cercopithecus mona (mona monkey) successfully introduced to Grenada and São Tomé and Príncipe
- Chlorocebus sabaeus (green monkey) successfully introduced to Central America
- Macaca arctoides (stump-tailed macaque) successfully introduced to Mexico
- Macaca cyclopis (Formosan rock macaque) successfully introduced to Japan

== Rodents ==
- Capybara successfully introduced to Florida
- Gambian pouch rat successfully introduced to Florida's islands, Gulf coast of USA, and Central America (captive only), and unsuccessfully introduced to mainland Florida
- Pacific rat successfully introduced to New Zealand and Hawaii
- Black rat successfully introduced to worldwide
- Brown rat successfully introduced to worldwide
- House mouse successfully introduced to worldwide
- Coypu successfully introduced to most of USA, Asia, Europe, and Africa and unsuccessfully introduced to California. Eradicated from UK.
- Muskrat successfully introduced to Asia, Europe, and South America. Eradicated from UK.
- Bank vole successfully introduced to British Isles
- Edible dormouse successfully introduced to British Isles
- Siberian chipmunk successfully introduced to Europe and Asia
- Grey squirrel successfully introduced to Europe, British Isles, Africa, and Pitcairn Islands
- Callosciurus finlaysonii (Finlayson's squirrel) successfully introduced to Europe and Japan
- Callosciurus erythraeus (Pallas's squirrel) successfully introduced to Europe and Japan
- Funambulus pennantii (northern palm squirrel) successfully introduced to Australia
- Sciurus aberti (Abert's squirrel) successfully introduced to non-native areas of Arizona
- Sciurus aureogaster (Mexican red-bellied squirrel) successfully introduced to Florida
- Sciurus niger (fox squirrel) successfully introduced to western US
- Spermophilus parryii (Arctic ground squirrel) successfully introduced to Alaskan islands
- North American beaver successfully introduced to South America and Europe
- Castor fiber (European beaver) successfully reintroduced to Finland
- African porcupine successfully introduced to Europe (within natural range) and British Isles (captive only)
- Himalayan porcupine unsuccessfully introduced to British Isles (captive only)

== Rabbits and Hares ==
- Mountain hare successfully introduced to New Zealand, Scandinavia, and Réunion
- European rabbit successfully introduced to Australia, North America, Africa, Asia, New Zealand, British isles, South America, and Oceania
- European hare successfully introduced to Australia, British Isles, New Zealand, North America, and South America
- Lepus nigricollis (Indian hare) successfully introduced to Africa
- Sylvilagus floridanus (cottontail rabbit) successfully introduced to Europe

== See also ==
- List of introduced species
- Introduced species
- Invasive species
- List of invasive species
- List of introduced bird species
- Introduced species of the British Isles
