= Australian tree fern =

Australian tree fern may refer to any species of tree fern native to Australia, most commonly referring to:

- Cyathea australis
- Cyathea cooperi, native to New South Wales and Queensland
- Dicksonia antarctica, a species of evergreen tree fern
