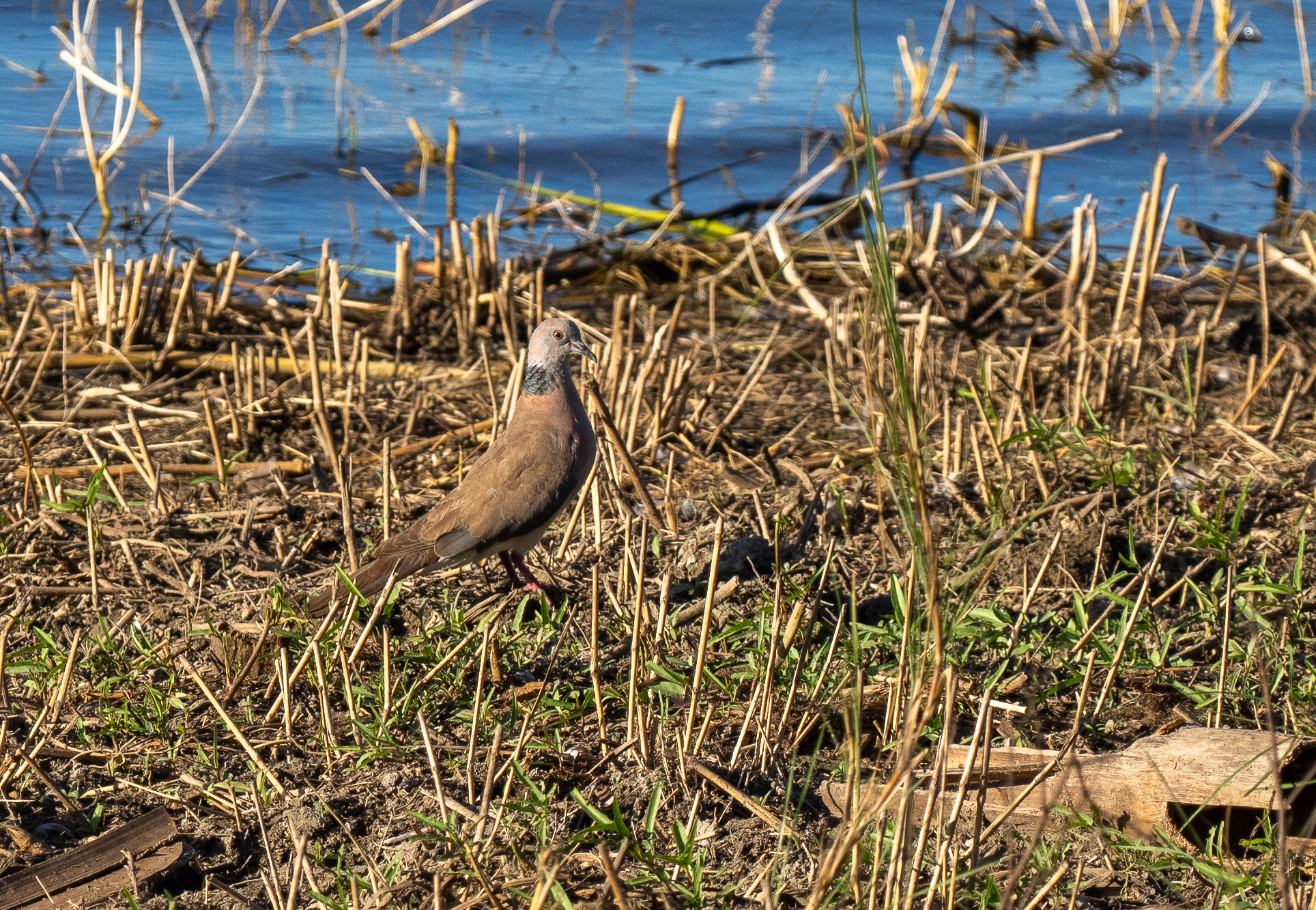
- In Laoag City, Luzon, Philippines

Conservation status
- Vulnerable (IUCN 3.1)

Scientific classification
- Kingdom: Animalia
- Phylum: Chordata
- Class: Aves
- Order: Columbiformes
- Family: Columbidae
- Genus: Streptopelia
- Species: S. dusumieri

Binomial name
- Streptopelia dusumieri (Temminck, 1823)

= Philippine collared dove =

Species of bird

The Philippine collared dove (Streptopelia dusumieri) is a species of bird in the family Columbidae. It was formerly considered a subspecies of the island collared dove (S. bitorquata).

The species occurs in the Philippines where it is called locally as bato-bato de collar. It has also been introduced into Guam and the Northern Mariana Islands, although the population on Guam has been severely reduced by introduced brown tree snakes. Its natural habitats are open grassland and agricultural land with trees and scrub. It was formerly considered a subspecies of the island collared dove. This species is threatened and is now rare in its native range due to interspecific competition from the Spotted dove and Red collared dove.

== Description and taxonomy ==
This species is described as a large brownish dove found in the open forest and even urban areas. It is primarily light brown with a pinkish wash on the breast and enck. It has a collar with a scaly black stripe and a grayish white head.

Its call is described as melancholic coo repeated at regular intervals.

Was considered conspecific with the Sunda collared dove as part of the Island collared dove species complex. Differs in a stronger contrast black and white tail but a weaker contrast in the undertail, a paler collar with a green sheen and scales and no white band, rusty pink plummage, shorter bill and a different song.

This species is monotypic and has no subspecies.

== Ecology and behavior ==
This species' diet has yet to be studied comprehensively but it is presumed to be the same as the Sunda collared dove which feeds mostly on seeds and feeds from the ground. It is typically observed singly or in pairs.

Breeding season is March to May. Nests 1 to 7 meters from the ground in branches in low trees at clearings, fishponds and mangroves. Nest is described as a typical flimsy dove nest consisting on messily arranged twigs. Clutch size is 2 to 3 eggs.

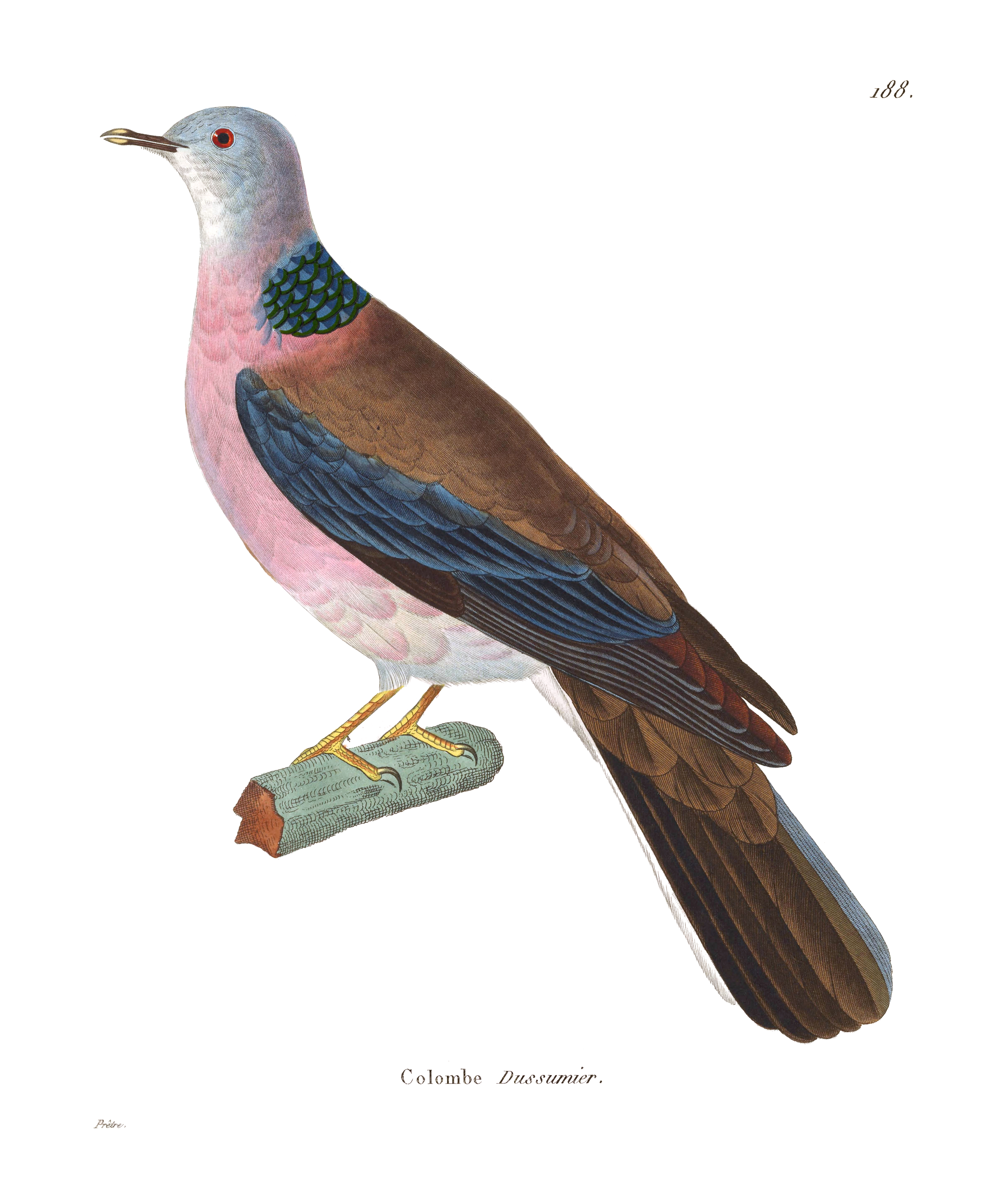
An illustration from 1838 by Jean Gabriel Prêtre

== Habitat and conservation status ==
An open country species inhabiting grassland and agricultural land with trees and scrub, while introduced populations are found in urban areas. Breeding has been recorded in March and May in the Philippines.

IUCN has assessed this bird as vulnerable with its population continuing to decline despite its tolerance for open habitat and proximity to urban areas. Its main threat is heavy interspecific competition from spotted doves and red collared doves. In Guam where the birds are still fairly common, nest success rate is just 2 to 5% in urban areas and 0 to 3% in forest habitat.

Conservation actions proposed to clarify nature and extent of threat from spotted doves and red collared doves are identification of remaining strongholds, monitoring of population trends, and assessment of desirability and feasibility of the control of competing species.
