= Island collared dove =

Island collared dove has been split into two species:

- Sunda collared dove, Streptopelia bitorquata
- Philippine collared dove, Streptopelia dusumieri
