= Avian range expansion =

Expansion of bird habitats

Avian range expansion describes how birds expand their habitat. Because of the activities of birdwatchers, these range expansions are well documented.

Throughout the last century a number of birds have expanded their range. Birds once thought confined to the West Coast have spread eastward to the East Coast, among them the Brewer's blackbird. Since the 1950s, the Brewer's blackbird, a relative of the red-winged blackbird, has spread east from the Oregon and California coasts to the Great Lakes region and onward to the East Coast, according to Audubon's 2005 Christmas Bird Count. The Inca dove first arrived as a native of Mexico and has slowly expanded northward into Kansas and Arkansas. Great tailed grackles have also moved in similar fashion northward.

Another region with documented range expansions is South Africa, where a number of birds have expanded westwards into the Western Cape province from other provinces due to habitat modification by humans and introductions. Examples of these include the Helmeted Guineafowl (introduced) and the Hadeda Ibis (natural expansion).

Range expansion may be explained by several different reasons.

== Reasons for range expansion ==
The largest reason for a bird to expand its range is to draw greater resources. Once resources for food, nesting, and potential mates become scarce in a particular area, birds and other animals move out of those areas to find new resources. Range expansion is a crucial component of evolution; however expansions are presently occurring at an alarming rate. One of the reasons for increased expansion is due to human alteration. Human causes such as changing of habitat and global climate change are leading factors in avian range expansion. Species that were previously adapted to the old niche are often replaced by species that are more adapted for newly created niche. For example, when forests are replaced by more urban areas, species such as the Inca dove are replaced by the mourning dove, allowing the mourning dove to expand its range. Bird populations are not static and naturally change over time. However, due to human effects such as global climate change and loss of habitat, a number of species are expanding in a particular range as the native species they displace are declining. In addition to environmental aspects that cause range expansion and subsequent decline of certain species, humans have introduced species that are largely responsible for decline of native species. Exotic species, such as the European starling which were introduced by Eugene Schieffelin in 1890 in New York City and then expanded to California by 1955, often do very well in new habitats. The lack of predators and new niche offer perfect conditions for the introduced species to flourish. These "exotic" species often displace other native species. For example, the European starling pursues aggressive breeding strategies that help it colonize new breeding areas. The European starling is an early breeder and out competes other native cavity nesters for nesting sites. Other cavity nesters include the kestrels, flycatchers, swallows, wrens, and bluebirds. The urbanization of much America also aids in the spread of the European starling (Podluka et al. 2004, Askins 2000, Elrich et al. 1998).

== Examples of when range expansion imperils other species ==
=== The barred owl and the northern spotted owl ===
In the 1970s the logging of old-growth forests accelerated, and the numbers of the northern spotted owl began to decline. Beginning in 1912 the barred owl began expanding its range westward and northward. Once considered an East Coast resident, the barred owl moved into the Rocky Mountains and southern Canada, into the spotted owl's territory. The barred owl is extremely adaptable, whereas the northern spotted owl is much more stagnant. The barred owl can live in virtually any forest and eat almost anything. The northern owl is adapted to best survive in old growth forest and relies mainly on the flying squirrel as a food resource. Much like human counterparts, as the barred owl expanded westward these larger more adaptable birds forced native owls, such as the northern owl, off their territory. The barred owl is about 20% larger and will feast on flying squirrels out of convenience. Biologists have noted a severe decline in the breeding population of northern owls, whereas the barred owl populations thrive (Levy, 2004).

=== The brown-headed cowbird and other songbirds ===
The brown-headed cowbird is a brood parasite, which places its own eggs in nest of other birds, placing the burden of parenting on other birds. The brown-headed cowbird is thought to have a center of origin in the Great Plains of North America, but has expanded in both directions to spread across most of North America. The behavior of the brown-headed cowbird causes range expansion at the expense of other birds such as warblers, sparrows, and vireos. The efforts required for raising the cowbird chick often exhaust the parent and lead to either the death of the parent or the death of the other chicks within the nest, thus decreasing the chances of reproduction for that songbird. In a study conducted by the University of British Columbia, cowbird parasitism was shown to be a direct cause of population declines in black-capped vireos, Bell's vireo, and the southwestern willow flycatcher (Levy, 2004).

== Conclusion ==
Avian species have expanded their range since long before humans. In fact the geographical range of avian species is often a very dynamic phenomenon, with the ranges of various species expanding and some contracting. Range expansions are important because they often signal changing habitats, whether the reason can be explained by natural causes or more often human aided causes. Avian range expansion can produce considerable effects in both the population numbers of the invaded species as well as numbers of hybrid species created. The interaction of invading species and native species is often very dynamic.
