= White-collared seedeater =

The white-collared seedeater (Sporophila torqueola) has been split into two species:

- Cinnamon-rumped seedeater, Sporophila torqueola
- Morelet's seedeater, Sporophila morelleti
