= Sailfin catfish =

Sailfin catfish, Janitor fish can refer to any of:

- Pterygoplichthys multiradiatus - the orinoco sailfin catfish
- Pterygoplichthys pardalis - the amazon sailfin catfish
- Pterygoplichthys anisitsi - the snow king sailfin catfish
- Glyptoperichthys gibbiceps (reclassified as Pterygoplichthys gibbiceps) - sailfin plec (L164) also known as leopard plec or spotted sailfin catfish
