= Japanese white-eye in Hawaii =

Species of bird

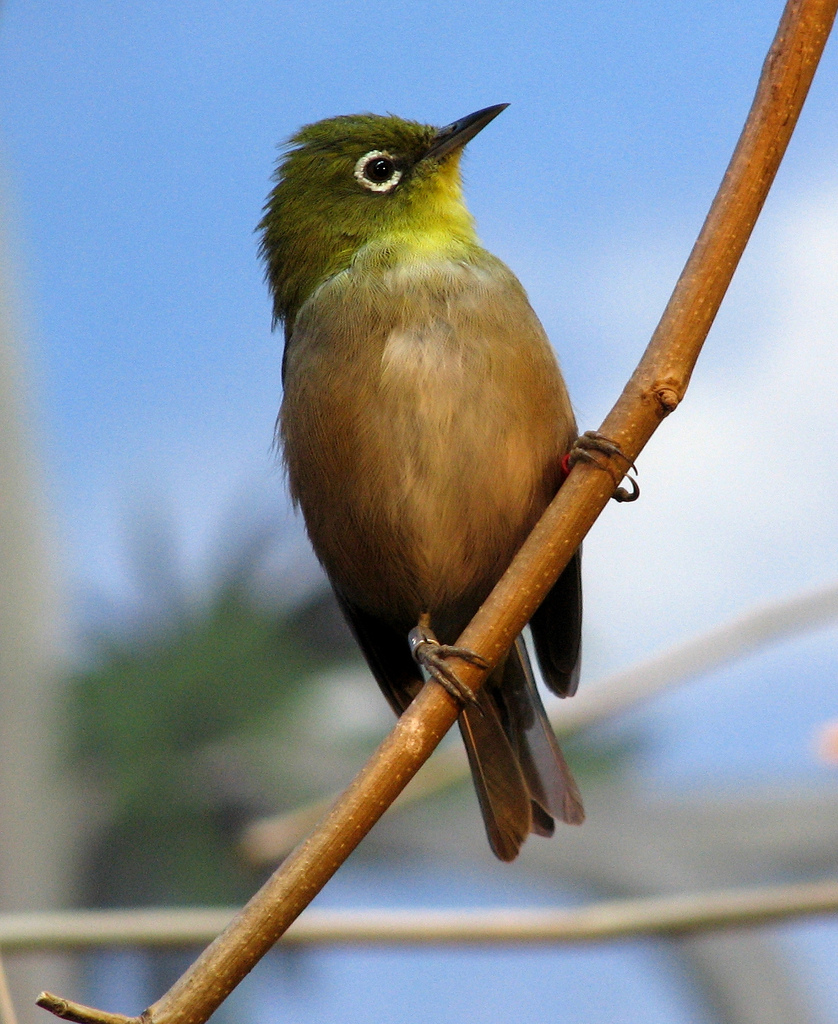
Japanese white-eye

Along with a number of other organisms, the warbling white-eye (Zosterops japonicus) (formerly the Japanese white-eye) has become an invasive species in Hawaii. Its native range includes much of East Asia, including Japan, China, Vietnam, Taiwan, and the Philippines.

Introduced to Hawaii in 1929 as a means of insect control, it has since become a common bird on the Hawaiian islands, and has become a vector for avian parasites that are now known to adversely affect populations of native birds such as Hawaiian honeycreepers, as well as spreading invasive plant species through discarded seeds.

== Effects on native Hawaiian birds ==
The warbling white-eye's successful invasion of the Hawaiian Islands can be partially attributed to the lack of coevolution between endemic species and the white-eye. The occurrence of coevolution is driven by species interactions that directly impact physical development. In many cases coevolution is derived from competition in which both species vie for an edge or advantage to maximize their dietary or "resource" acquirement. Because the white-eye did not coevolve with avian species native to Hawaii, the white-eye has certain advantageous characteristics, such as the resistance to avian malaria, that the native species do not possess. The native species never had a chance to change in response to evolutionary changes in the white-eye.

White-eye range expansion has also been cited as a negative effect on native bird species. White-eye expansion is arguably characteristic of what E.O Wilson called a "Taxon Cycle". The cycle attempts to model the interactions between endemic species and newly immigrated non-native populations through the use of "Stages" –each with defined characteristics with respect to overall population behavior. A newly immigrated species (Stage 1) is expected to experience rapid growth through the new habitat largely due to the lack of effective endemic (Stage 3) persistence – the ability of the community to repel outside forces that may cause changes in its species composition. This prediction matches much of the current data indicating the white-eye has become highly common on most, if not all, of the Hawaiian Islands. The force of natural selection has promoted the dietary or "resource" specialization of many of the later stage endemic species – a prime example being the honeycreeper. This particular species has become especially affected by the white-eye presence due to honeycreeper dependence on nectar as a primary resource. In contrast, the white-eye maintains a highly diverse selection of dietary options (including nectar) and is able to take full advantage of numerous habitats on the islands. The differences in resource limitations between the two species has resulted in the drastic decline of the honeycreeper population, as they are outcompeted by the invasive white-eye. This occurrence is best explained by the competitive exclusion principle, which dictates that two complete competitors cannot co-exist.

Increases in the warbling white-eye population in Hawaii have negative effects on the growth and survival of native birds in the community. In one study, the bill length, tarsus length, and mass of native Hawaiian passerine birds were measured during 1987-2006 using the technique of mark and recapture. In 2000, juveniles of every native species showed lower mass and shorter bills than before. These changes led to decreased survival of both juveniles and second year individuals/older adults. These birds also showed shorter tarsi, the group of bones in the hind feet of some vertebrates, although this change was less drastic than that seen with the bills. Birds with original bill lengths closest to that of the white-eye suffered the most, undergoing changes that lowered their foraging efficiency. For example, the endangered Hawaiian akepa was viable during 1987–1999, but not during 2000–2006, in association with an abrupt increase in white-eyes. These facts document strong community-wide exploitative competition for food between the warbling white-eye and passerine birds native to Hawaii, meaning the white-eye depletes the availability of food for other bird species. They also compete for space; the white-eye has expanded its range into remote areas within the two decades 1980–2000. The distribution of the warbling white-eye has been shown to negatively correlate with the distributions of native birds, meaning as the white-eye becomes more highly distributed, native birds become less distributed. Many Hawaiian birds are endangered or already extinct; this occurrence is believed to be related to the invasion of the white-eye.

== Effects on Hawaiian plants ==
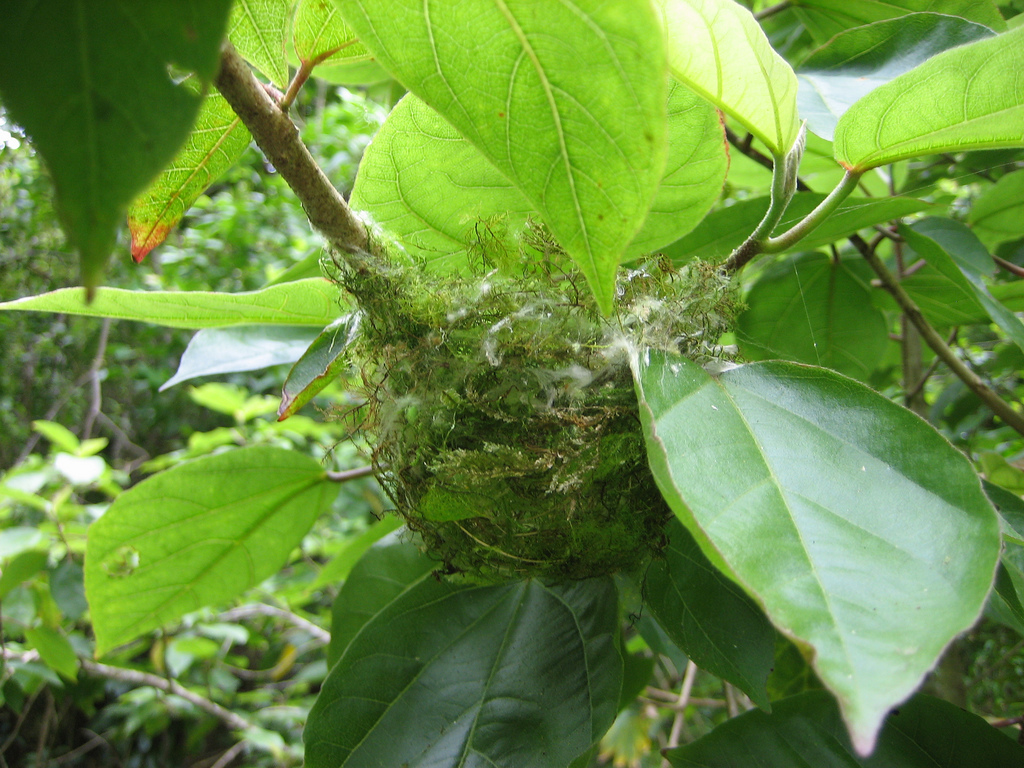
Nest located in Kauai

Because many of the Hawaiian birds that have gone extinct acted as pollinators, there is a concern about the survival of certain plant species, such as the Hawaiian Lobelioideae. The warbling white-eye has been pinned as a possible replacement pollinator. Lobelioids that were pollinated by native birds that are now extinct may benefit from the presence of the white-eye, but more detailed studies are needed to determine the degree of pollen transfer affected by white-eyes. Also, this replacement could lead to differing levels of outcrossing compared to those resulting from visits by the native species of birds. Outcrossing is the introduction of unrelated genetic material into a breeding line. Therefore, white-eye pollination may prove to be beneficial, as outcrossing increases genetic diversity, thus reducing the probability of all individuals being subject to disease; increasing genetic diversity also reduces genetic abnormalities. Again, a more detailed study is needed to determine the potential benefits of white-eye pollination.

A similar trend to that of Hawaii's was seen when the bird was introduced to the Bonin Islands of Japan; while native to the country, the white-eye was not originally present on these islands. As in Hawaii, the study conducted in the Bonin Islands suggests the warbling white-eye may be taking over the actions of native birds in relation to plants present on the islands. Unlike Hawaii (in which this action was pollination), the action taken over by the white-eye in the Bonin Islands is seed dispersal; this dispersal was previously carried out by native birds – whether still present or already extinct. The white-eye has not been cited as taking over seed dispersal in Hawaii because they rarely ingest the seeds of Hawaiian plants, such as the firetree. For this reason, they cannot disperse the seeds over great distances, making them poor seed dispersers. While the actions of the white-eye on the Hawaiian and Bonin Islands are indeed different, they are both significant, because islands themselves are particularly vulnerable to the drastic effects of introduced competitors, predators, and diseases when these communities have evolved in their absence.

== See also ==
- List of birds of Hawaii
