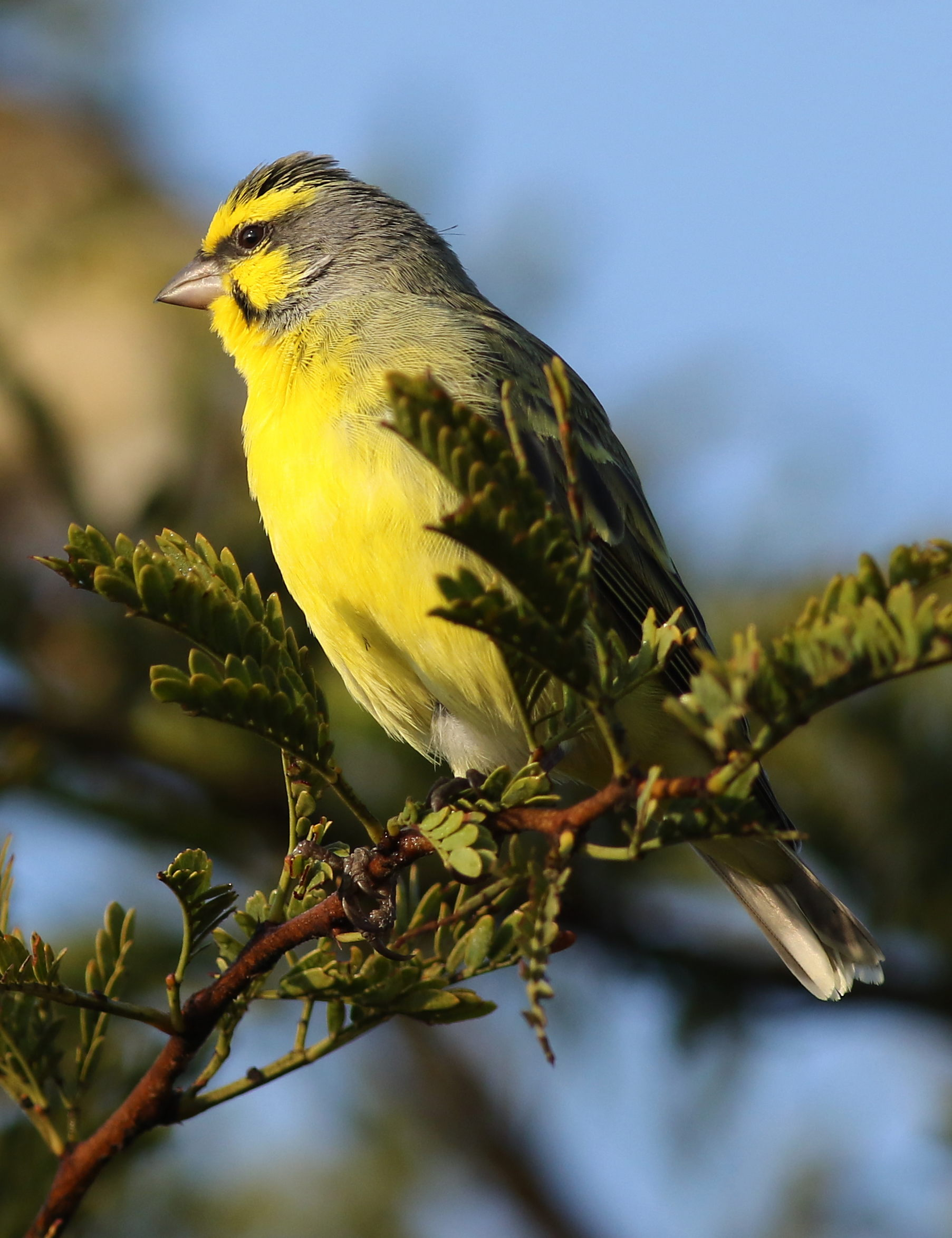
- Crithagra mozambica, Pilanesberg National Park, Northwest Province, South Africa

Conservation status
- Least Concern (IUCN 3.1)

Scientific classification
- Kingdom: Animalia
- Phylum: Chordata
- Class: Aves
- Order: Passeriformes
- Family: Fringillidae
- Subfamily: Carduelinae
- Genus: Crithagra
- Species: C. mozambica

Binomial name
- Crithagra mozambica (Müller, 1776)

Synonyms
- Serinus mozambicus

= Yellow-fronted canary =

Species of bird

The yellow-fronted canary (Crithagra mozambica) is a small passerine bird in the finch family. It is sometimes known in aviculture as the green singing finch or the green singer.

This bird is a resident breeder in Africa south of the Sahara Desert. Its habitat is open woodland and cultivation. It nests in trees, laying three or four eggs in a compact cup nest. It has been introduced to Mauritius, Rodrigues, Réunion, Assumption Island, Mafia Island, Puerto Rico, and the Hawaiian Islands, where it is found on western Hawaii, southeastern Oahu and Molokai.

The yellow-fronted canary is a common, gregarious seedeater. It is 11–13 cm in length. The adult male has a green back and brown wings and tail. The underparts and rump are yellow, and the head is yellow with a grey crown and nape and a black malar stripe. The female is similar, but with a weaker head pattern and duller underparts. Juveniles are greyer than the female, especially on the head.

Its song is a warbled zee-zeree-chereeo.

== Taxonomy ==
The yellow-fronted canary was formerly placed in the genus Serinus, but phylogenetic analysis using mitochondrial and nuclear DNA sequences found the genus to be polyphyletic. The genus was therefore split and a number of species including the yellow-fronted canary were moved to the resurrected genus Crithagra Swainson 1827.

=== Subspecies ===
Ten subspecies are accepted.

- C. m. mozambica (Müller, 1776) - Coastal Kenya and Mafia Island (Tanzania) south to Zimbabwe, Mozambique, eastern and southeastern Botswana, and northeastern South Africa (North West and Limpopo to Free State). Nominate subspecies.
- C. m. punctigula (Reichenow, 1898): Cameroon (north to Toukte, Grand Capitaine and Koum). Gray on the back of the head, with less extensive yellow markings on the forehead, and a duller yellow on the face and throat. Broad, dark eyestripe. Females have blackish spots on the chin and throat.
- C. m. caniceps (d'Orbigny, 1839): Senegal to Cameroon (south to Benue plain). Slightly less yellow on the forehead than C. m. mozambica. The yellow coloration on the head is reduced and duller, with a broad, dark eyestripe and gray coloration on the top and back of the head. The upperparts are olive-green. Similarly to C. m. punctigula, females have blackish spots on the chin and throat.
- C. m. tando: Gabon to north Angola and southwestern Democratic Republic of the Congo; introduced to São Tomé island, São Tomé and Príncipe. Similar to C. m. samaliyae, with a darker green coloration of the upperparts and a green tinge on the flanks.
- C. m. vansoni: Extreme southeastern Angola and adjacent Namibia to north Botswana, south west Zambia. Paler yellow coloration, and the upperparts are less heavily streaked.
- C. m. barbata: southern Chad, Central African Republic, western Sudan, western and southern South Sudan, eastern Democratic Republic of the Congo, Uganda, southwestern Kenya, and central Tanzania. No gray coloration on the head, with a dark olive-gray eyestripe. The upperparts are a more yellowish olive-green, and the flanks are tinged green.
- C. m. samaliyae: Southeastern Democratic Republic of the Congo to southwestern Tanzania and adjacent Zambia. Upperparts are more yellowish olive-green, with darker and heavier streaking on the back, golden-yellow underparts, and olive-green ear-coverts.
- C. m. grotei: Southeastern Sudan (east of the Nile), eastern South Sudan, and western and southwestern Ethiopia. Extensive yellow on the forehead, with a grayish-olive eyestripe. The upperparts are yellow-green with some brown tinges, and the underparts are a paler yellow.
- C. m. gommaensis: Eritrea and northwestern and central Ethiopia. Similar to C. m. barbata, with less yellow on the forehead, and upperparts being a darker olive-green or tinged with brown.
- C. m. granti (Clancey, 1957) - Eastern South Africa (Mpumalanga and KwaZulu-Natal south to Eastern Cape), eastern Eswatini, and southern Mozambique. Grayer mustache marking that often extends to meet gray on the neck, and the head and back are a deeper green with darker, heavier streaking.
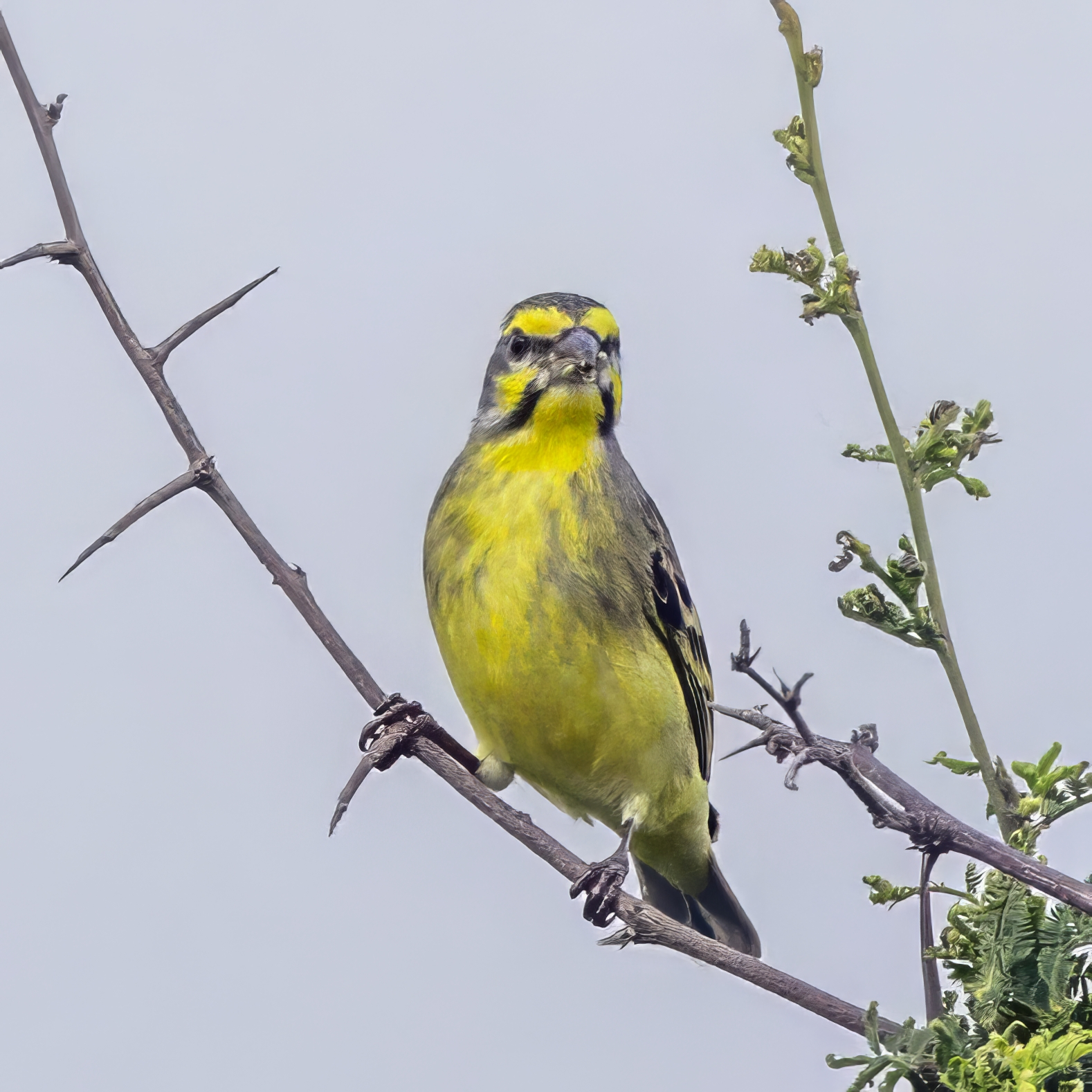
male C. m. granti
Kruger National Park

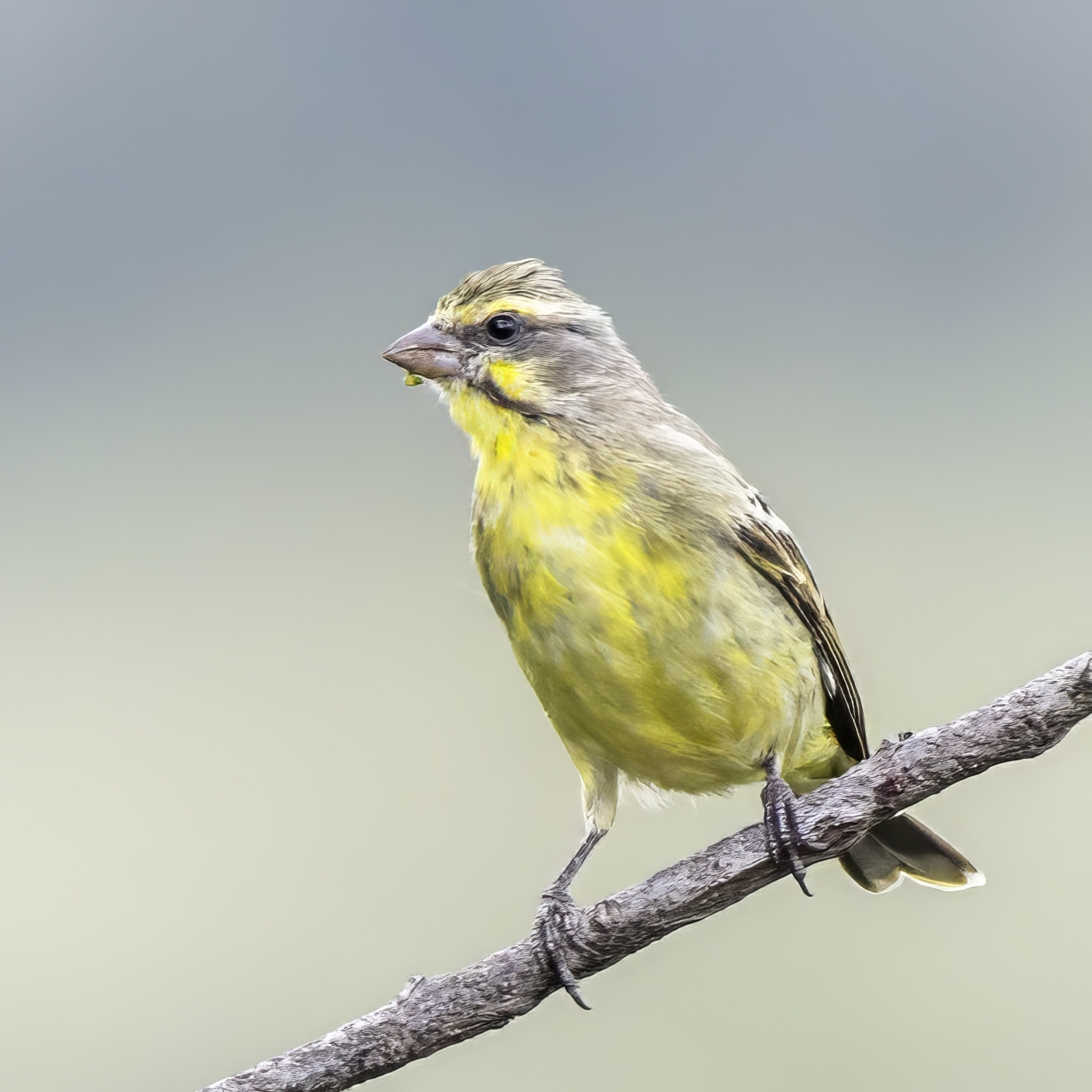
female C. m. granti
South Africa

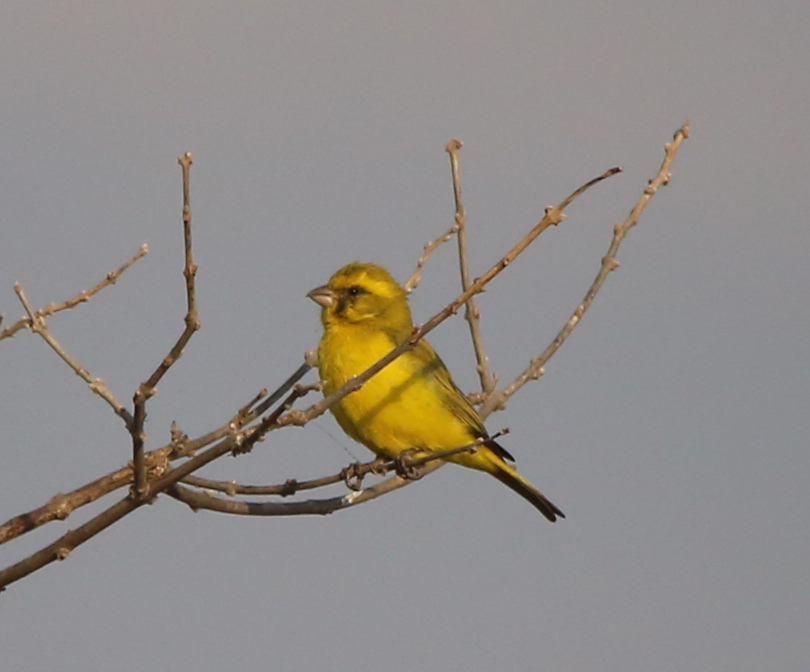
C. m. vansoni Botswana

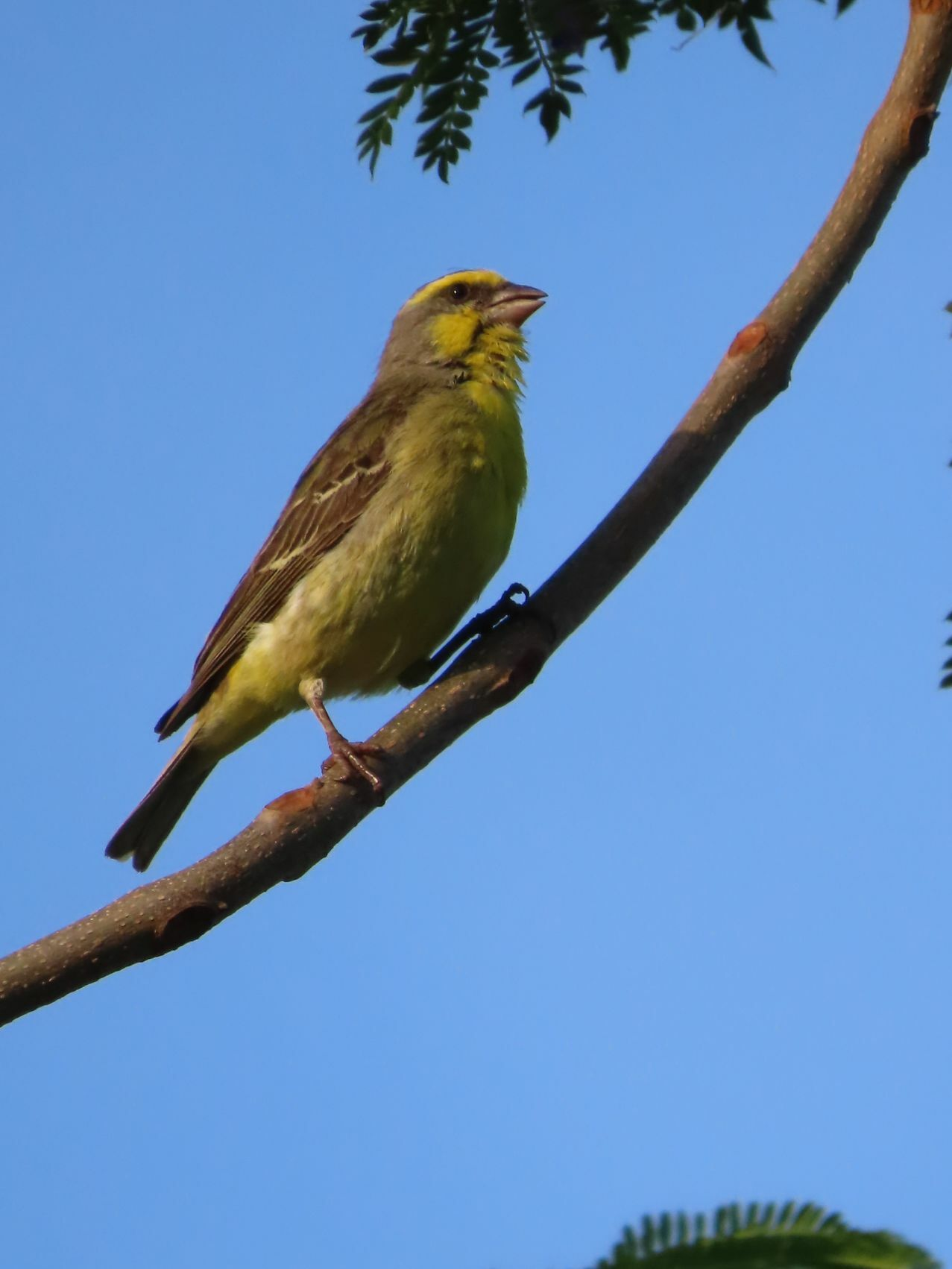
C. m. mozambica South Africa

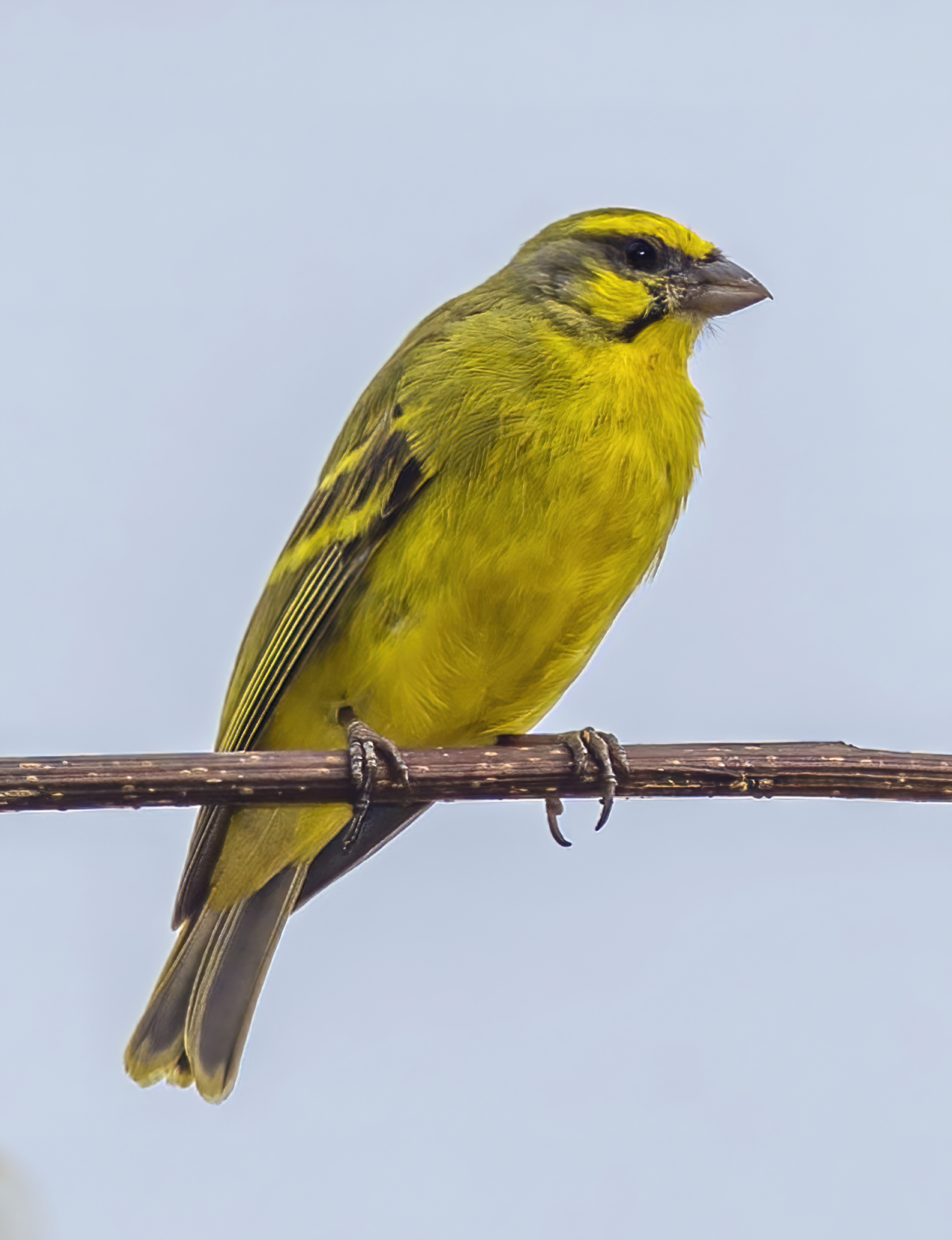
C. m. tando São Tomé island

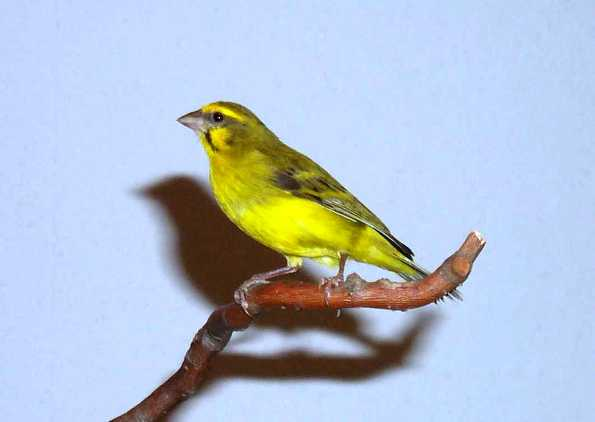
C. m. barbata Captive bird
