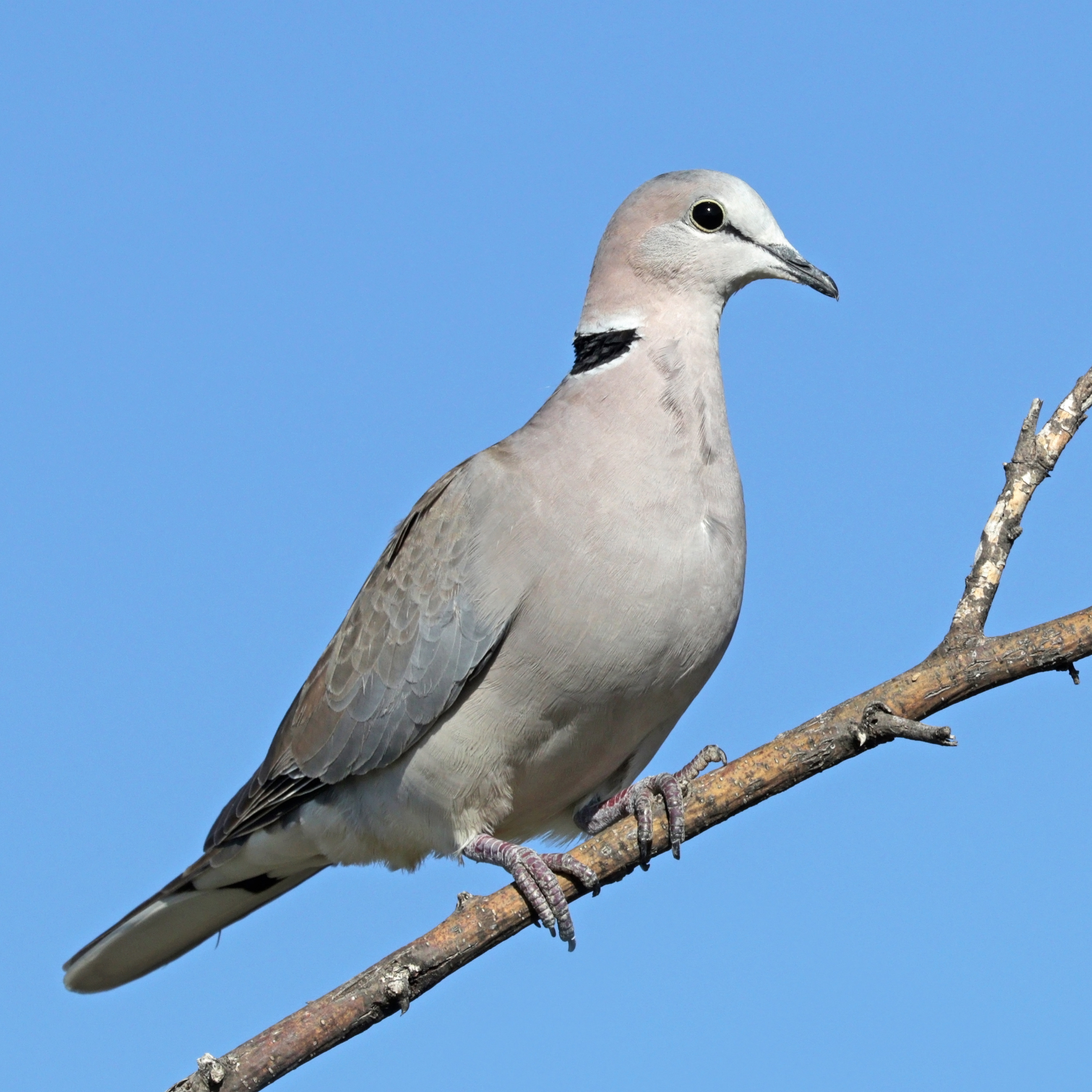
- S. c. damarensis Etosha National Park, Namibia

Conservation status
- Least Concern (IUCN 3.1)

Scientific classification
- Kingdom: Animalia
- Phylum: Chordata
- Class: Aves
- Order: Columbiformes
- Family: Columbidae
- Genus: Streptopelia
- Species: S. capicola

Binomial name
- Streptopelia capicola (Sundevall, 1857)

= Ring-necked dove =

Species of bird

The ring-necked dove (Streptopelia capicola), also known as the Cape turtle dove, half-collared dove, or the Cape Lager is a widespread and often abundant dove species in East and southern Africa. It is a mostly sedentary bird, found in a variety of open habitats. Within range, its penetrating and rhythmic, three-syllabled crooning is a familiar sound at any time of the year. Its name is derived from the semi-collar of black feathers on the lower nape, a feature shared with a number of Streptopelia species. Like all doves, they depend on surface water. They congregate in large flocks at waterholes in dry regions to drink and bathe.

== Description ==
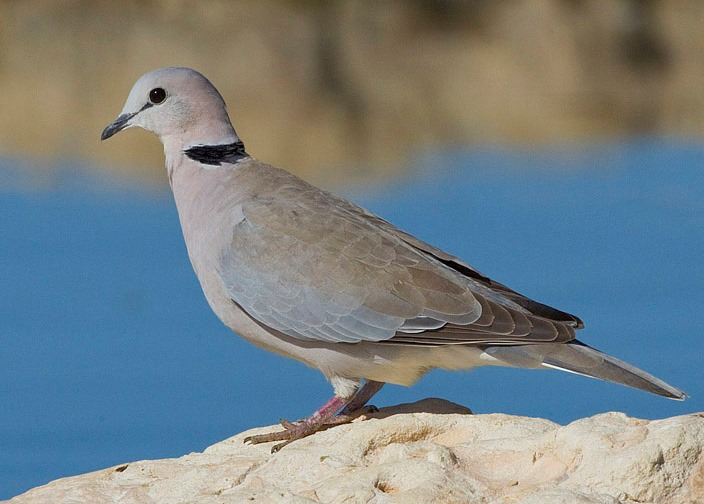
The plumage tones are darkest on the upper parts, while the lower belly and vent are white

Their body feathers are darkest on the upper side, where they are coloured in dull tones of grey and brown, with shades of lavender on the nape. It is paler below, where a tint of pinkish lavender is usually present. The lower belly and crissum (the undertail coverts surrounding the cloaca) is white. As with related species, they have white fringes and conspicuous white tips to the otherwise slate grey tail feathers. The tail pattern is particularly noticeable during the display flight.

Individual plumage variation is high, with some light and others almost sooty. Males and females look alike, although the males are slightly bigger. They measure 25–26.5 cm (9.8–10.4 in) in length and weigh 92–188 g (3.2–6.6 oz). The eyes are almost black, the bill is black and the feet are dark purple.

An immature is duller and lacks the semi-collar of an adult. It also has buff edges to all the upper part and wing covert feathers, while the plumage below is broadly edged greyish-white.

== Habitat ==
It occupies a diverse range of habitat types, including semi-desert scrub, Boscia and Acacia savannah, a variety of woodland types, farmlands, open plantations and alien acacia thickets. Only closed forest or plantations, or the extensive waterless dune fields and gravel plains of the Namib are unsuited to their requirements. In southern Africa, they are most commonly observed in fynbos regions, miombo and mopane woodlands, besides any grassland types from moist to dry regions. Their presence in the latter areas has been facilitated by the planting of trees in groves, for instance around farm homesteads.

They are vulnerable at exposed waterholes or in plantations, where they are preyed on by lanner falcons and black sparrowhawks, respectively. In addition, they are preyed on by reptiles, wildcats, jackals, genets, herons, storks, eagles and barn owls. Nests are vulnerable to birds, snakes and, in Cape Town, eastern grey squirrels that were introduced.

Seasonal movements are most noticeable in tropical areas, while nomadic movements occur in arid environments with limited resources. They seldom occur above 2,000 metres.

== Habits ==
These doves are usually found alone or in pairs, although they do form larger flocks around roosts or sources of food and water, sometimes comprising hundreds of birds. They are quite noisy in these groups, not only for the various calls they make throughout the day, or often into (mainly moonlit) nights, but also due to the loud clatter of their wings when they take flight.

Song

Their song is a loud and harsh "kuk-COORRRR-uk, ..." (sometimes interpreted as "how's father?" or "work harder") which they may repeat ten to forty times. Less often a repeated "wuh-ka-RROOO, ..." may be given. A raspy, snarling "kooorr", or "knarrrrrr", call is often given when it alights on a perch, arrives at an incubating mate or chases another dove away. Ring-necked doves roost in treetops during the night and forage for food on the ground by day. Peak foraging times are early morning and late afternoon, and they drink mainly in the morning. When they walk on the ground, their heads bob back and forth with each small step.

== Food ==
They feed mainly on seeds (of grasses, cereal grains, lupins, milkweeds, alien acacias and pines), but also on broken fruit and berries (of oaks, gums, currants and Lantana), and insects on occasion (earthworms, termites, weevils and other). Other recorded food items include small sedge bulbs, fleshy succulent leaves, aloe nectar and sugary aphid secretions.

== Breeding ==
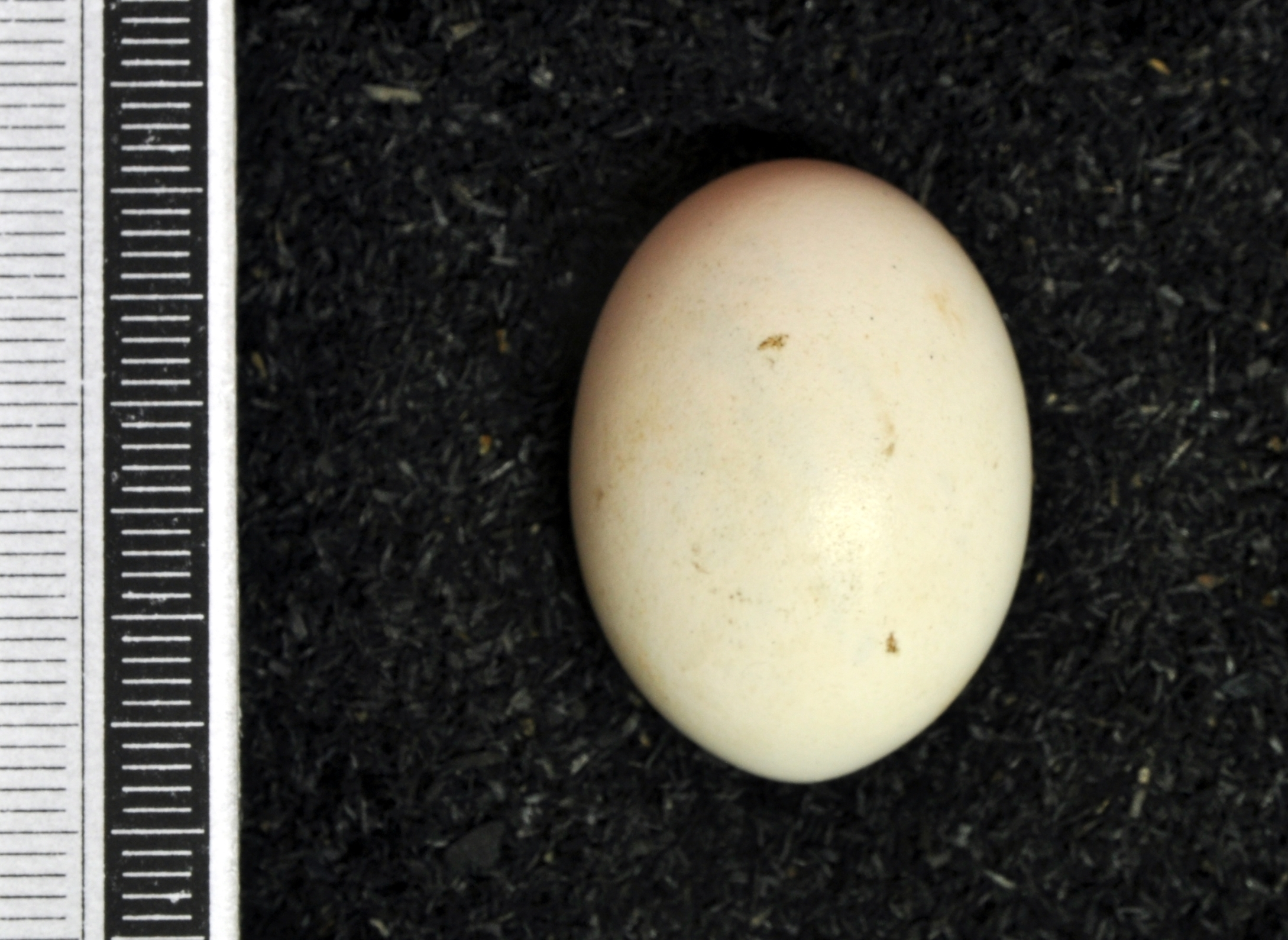
Egg in the Museum Wiesbaden collection

They are monogamous, territorial nesters. Males display by flapping up a steep gradient before spiraling down with wings and tail spread out. From a perch or on the ground, the male will engage in a bowing display synchronized with a rolling crooning, "uk-carrroooo, ...", while the throat is inflated. A pair will give a double coo with a long second syllable when selecting a nest site. The female takes two to three days to construct the flimsy platform nest. It is made of twigs and leaf petioles that are carefully selected by the male (as in other dove species) and delivered to her at the nest site. The nest is placed 2 to 10 meters above the ground on a horizontal branch fork. Quite often, an old nest of another species may be used. Two to four pure white eggs are laid and both sexes participate in the incubation, which takes about two weeks. Chicks are fed regurgitated food by both parents and fledge after about 16 days. Several broods (up to five) may be raised in a single season.

== Subspecies ==
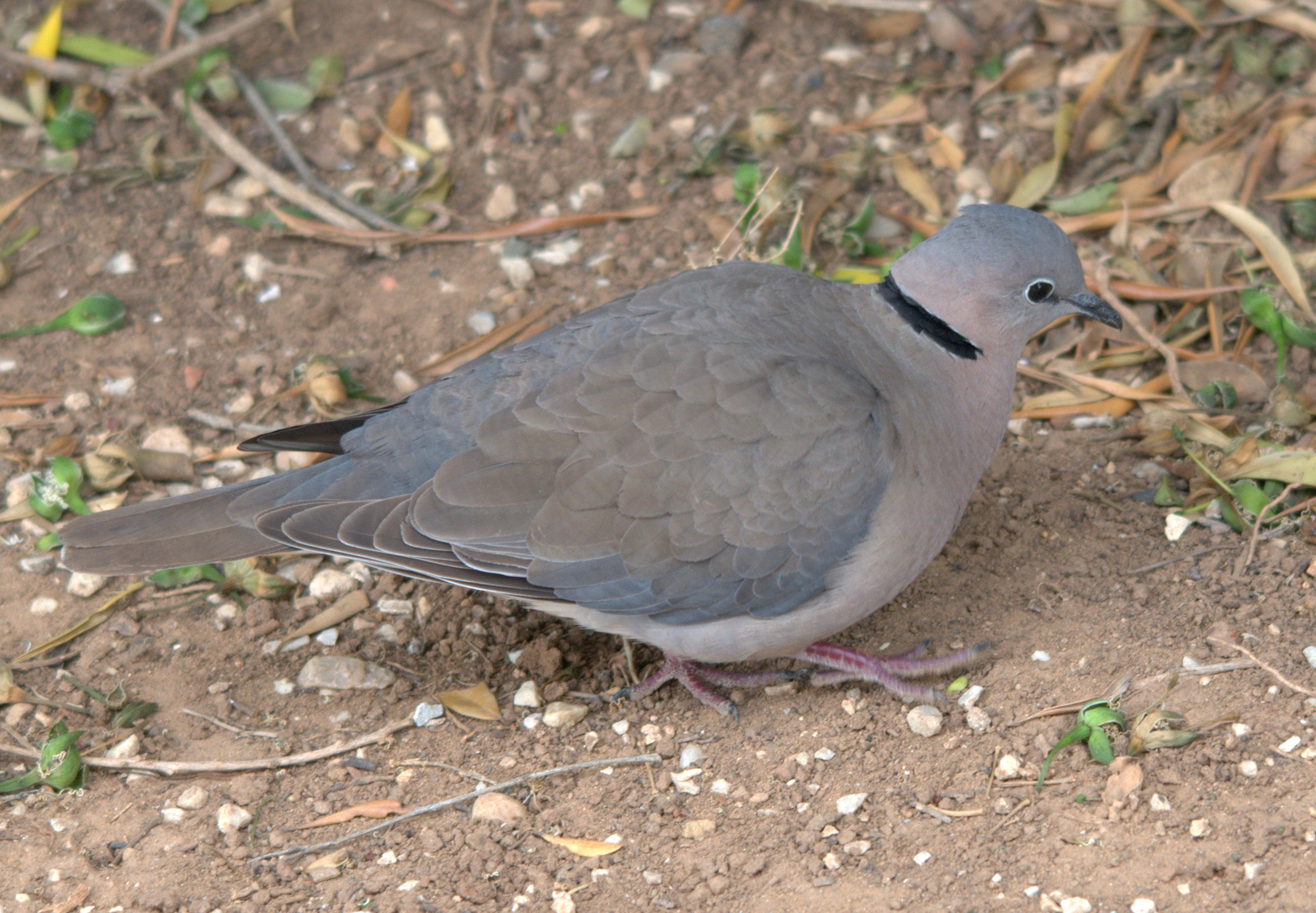
Nominate race at Addo N.P.

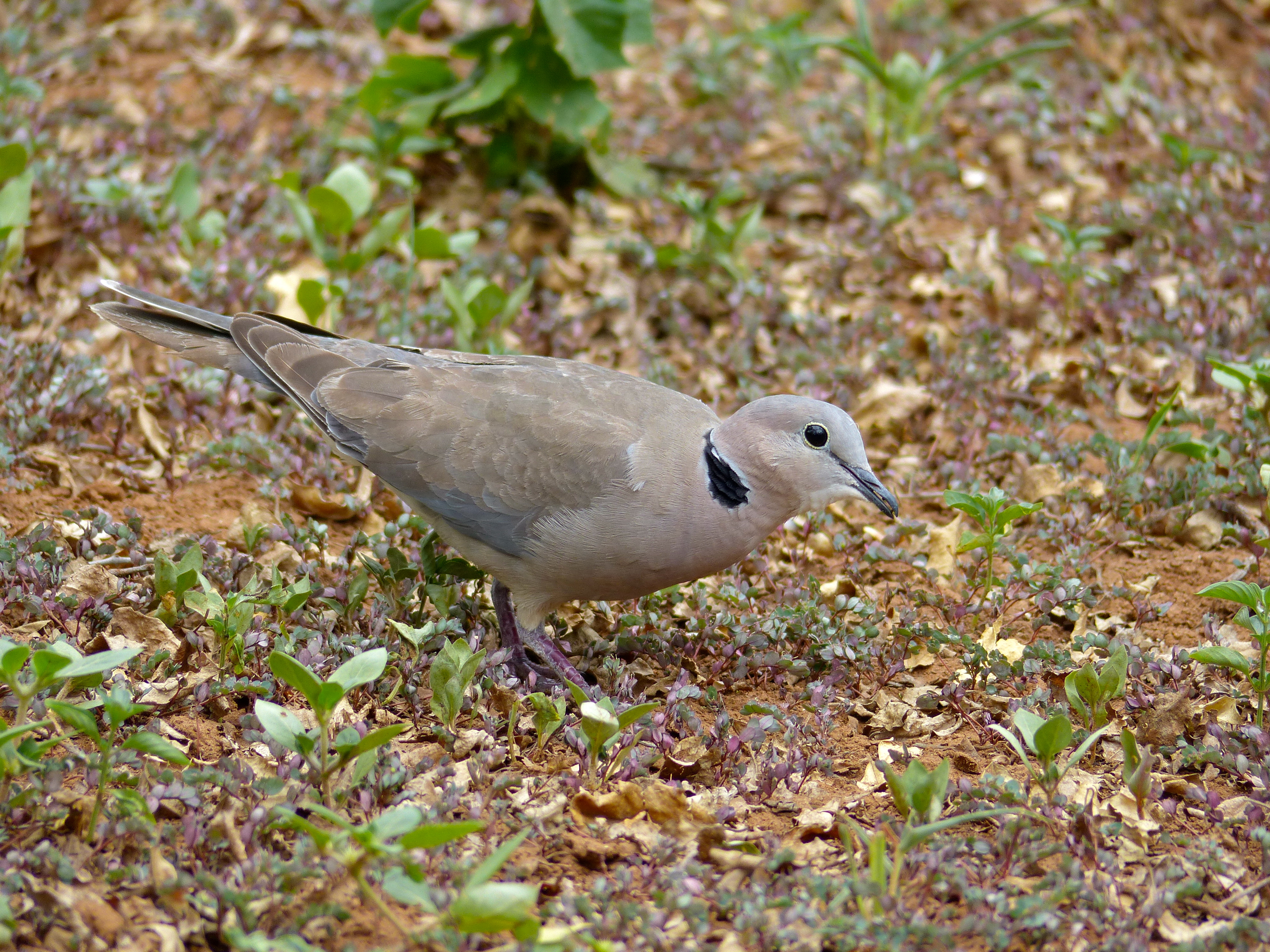
S. c. tropica in the Kruger N.P.

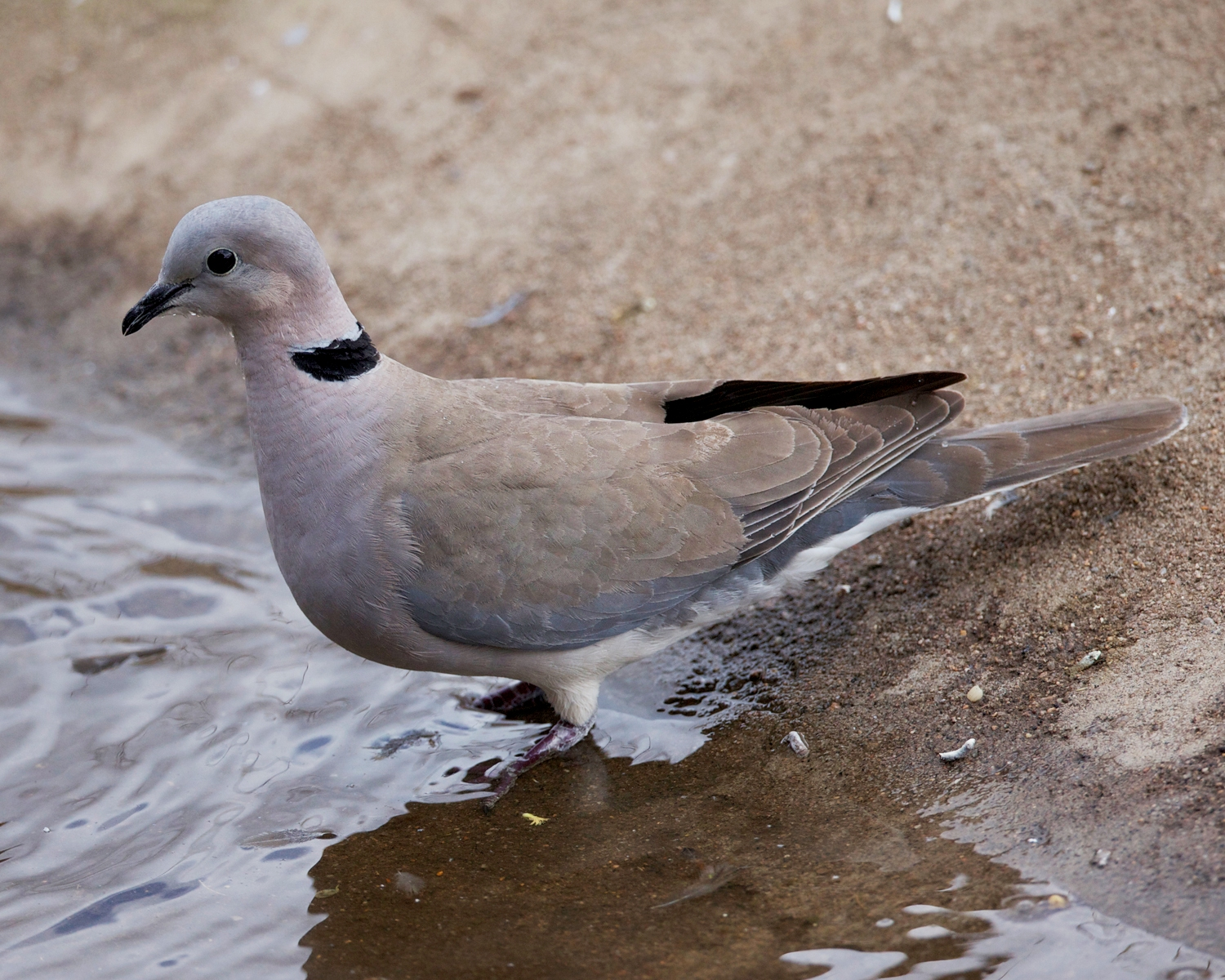
S. c. somalica in Tanzania

There are six subspecies. They differ mainly in plumage shade, with those of dry regions being paler and greyer. Western Ethiopian and South Sudanese birds are sometimes separated from S. c. tropica as S. c. electa (Madarász, 1913).

- S. c. capicola – southwestern (winter rainfall) South Africa
- S. c. abunda Clancey, 1960 – central South Africa
- S. c. damarensis (Hartlaub & Finsch, 1870) – arid interior of southern Africa
- S. c. onguati Macdonald, 1957 – western Namibia and Angola
- S. c. tropica (Reichenow, 1902) – tropical and subtropical woodlands from South Africa to South Sudan
- S. c. somalica (Erlanger, 1905) – northern Tanzania to Somalia and Ethiopia

== Similar species ==
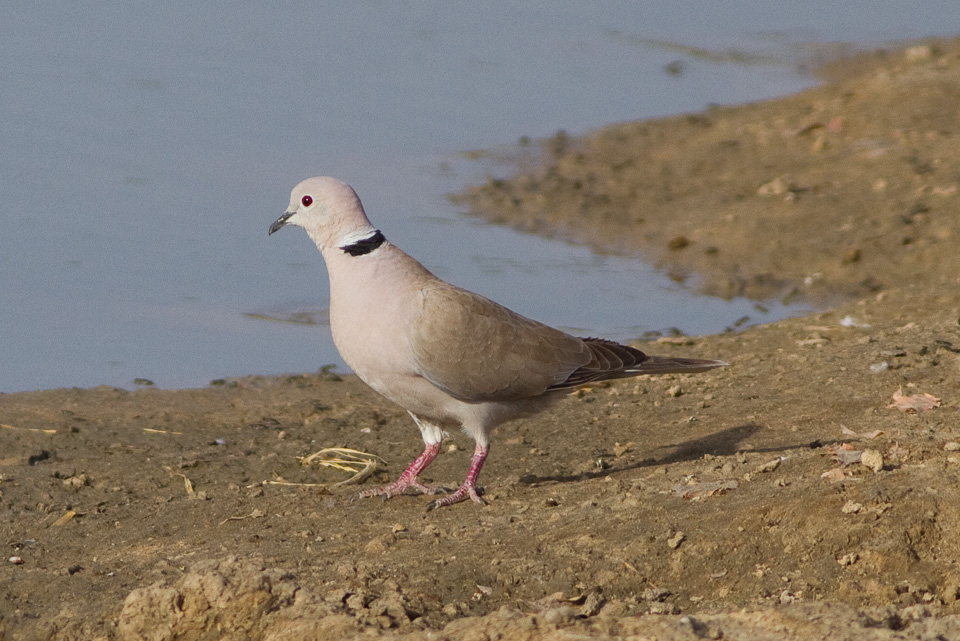
African collared dove

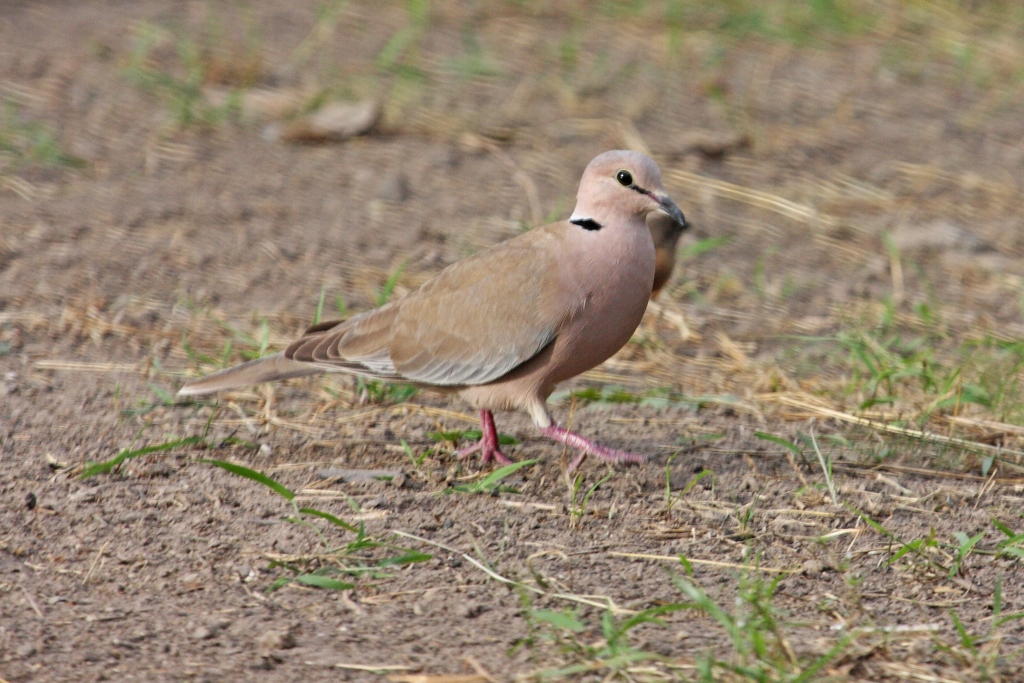
Vinaceous dove

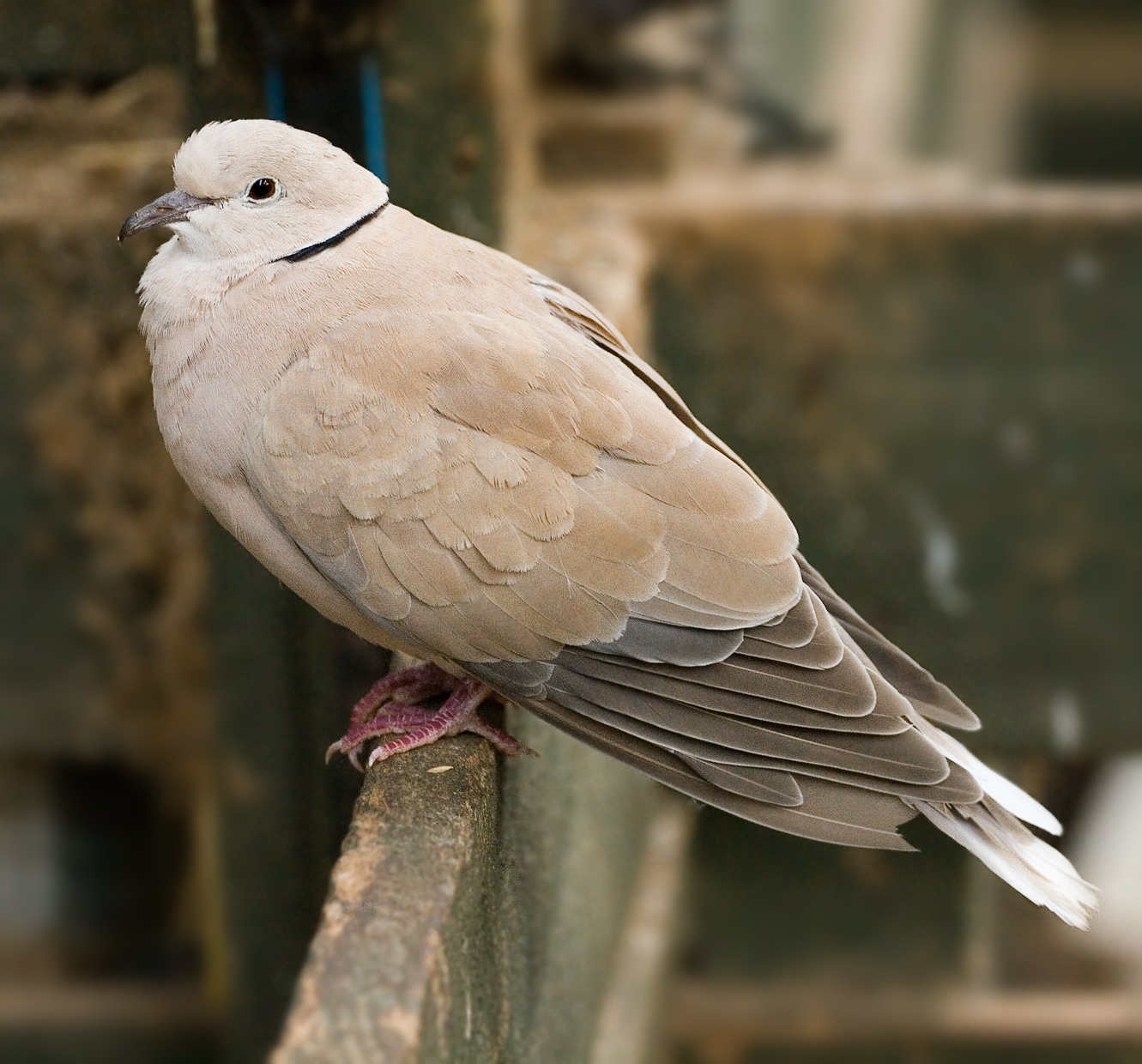
The Barbary dove is perhaps a domesticated form of the African collared dove

A number of Streptopelia species are very similar in appearance, all having semi-collars and subdued plumage tones. The ring-necked dove is distinguished from its locally sympatric sister species, the African collared dove, by call, the paler bases of the tail feathers, and the grey rather than pink crown feathers.

On appearance alone, it may also be confused with the Eurasian collared dove, vinaceous dove, red-eyed dove, red collared dove, African mourning dove or the Barbary dove, the last of these a popular cage bird with isolated feral populations. The red-eyed dove is generally similar, with an identical display flight. It, however, has dark wine red eyes and is larger and darker altogether, with a grey belly and grey tail tips. The African mourning dove has more grey about the head and pale yellow eyes.
