= Ringed dove =

Ringed dove may refer to:

- Columba palumbus, the common wood pigeon
- Streptopelia decaocto, the Eurasian collared dove

== See also ==
- Barbary dove
- Ring-necked dove
- genus Streptopelia
