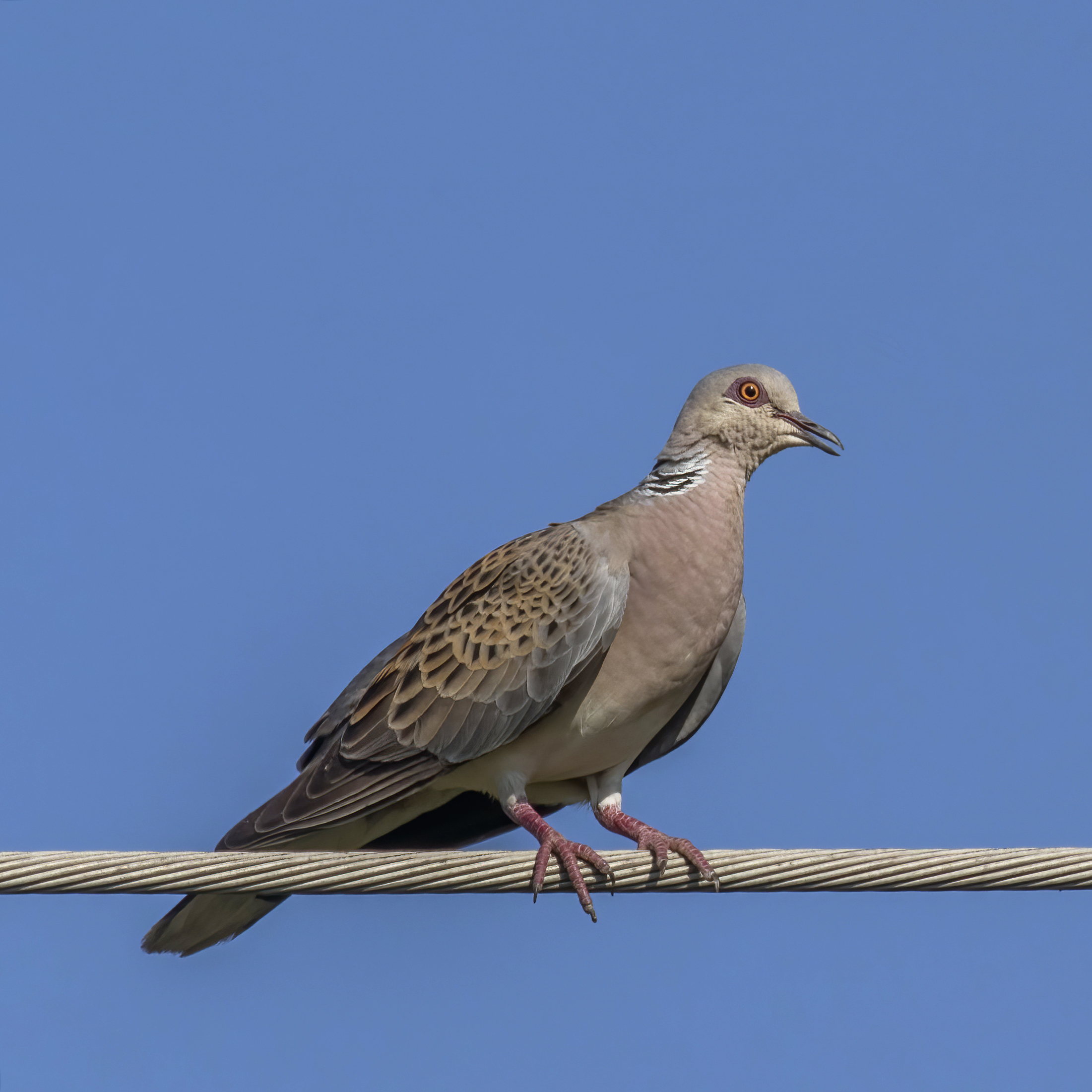
- An adult in Hungary

Conservation status
- Vulnerable (IUCN 3.1)

Scientific classification
- Kingdom: Animalia
- Phylum: Chordata
- Class: Aves
- Order: Columbiformes
- Family: Columbidae
- Genus: Streptopelia
- Species: S. turtur

Binomial name
- Streptopelia turtur (Linnaeus, 1758)
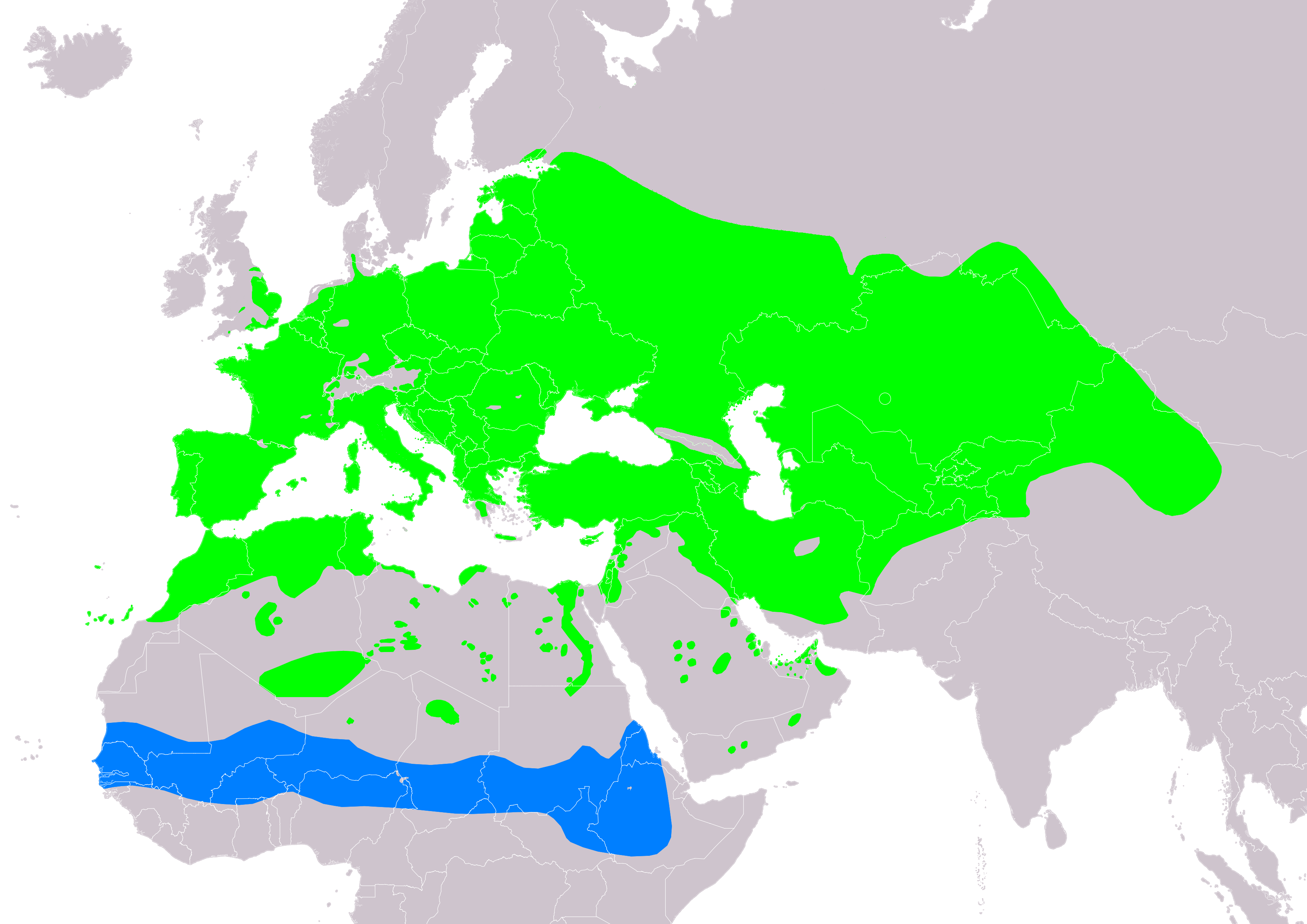
- Range of S. turtur breeding non-breeding

Synonyms
- Columba turtur (protonym); Turtur communis

Audio
- Song recorded in Hampshire, England

= European turtle dove =

Threatened or vulnerable species of bird

The European turtle dove (Streptopelia turtur) is a threatened or vulnerable member of the bird family Columbidae, the doves and pigeons. It breeds over a wide area of the south western Palearctic including north Africa but migrates to northern sub-Saharan Africa in winter.

== Taxonomy ==
The European turtle dove was formally described by the Swedish naturalist Carl Linnaeus in 1758 in the tenth edition of his Systema Naturae. He placed it with all the other pigeons in the genus Columba and coined the binomial name Columba turtur. The specific epithet turtur is the Latin word for a turtle dove. Linnaeus gave the locality as "India". This was an error, and the type locality has been designated as England. The species is now placed in the genus Streptopelia that was introduced in 1855 by the French ornithologist Charles Lucien Bonaparte.

Four subspecies are recognised:

- S. t. turtur (Linnaeus, 1758) – Europe, Madeira and the Canary Islands to western Siberia
- S. t. arenicola (Hartert, 1894) – Northwest Africa to Iran and western China
- S. t. hoggara (Geyr von Schweppenburg, 1916) – Air Massif and Hoggar Mountains (southern Sahara)
- S. t. rufescens (Brehm, CL, 1845) – Egypt and northern Sudan

Despite the identical spelling, the "turtle" of the name has no connection with the reptile of the same name; it is ultimately from Latin turtur, which is onomatopoeic, imitating the bird's song. From Latin the word was taken into Old English as turtla (male turtle dove) and turtle (female turtle dove), then to Middle English turtle (tortle, turtel, turtul), and from there into Modern English. The genus name Streptopelia is from Ancient Greek streptos meaning "collar", and peleia meaning "dove".

A few other doves in the genus Streptopelia and the related genus Nesoenas are also commonly called "turtle doves", while the name Turtur has also been given as a generic name to a less-closely related group of tropical African doves:

- Oriental turtle dove Streptopelia orientalis in Asia.
- Dusky turtle dove Streptopelia lugens in Africa.
- Adamawa turtle dove Streptopelia hypopyrrha in Africa.
- Malagasy turtle dove Nesoenas picturatus in Madagascar.

== Description ==
The European turtle dove is smaller and more slender than many other doves. It measures 26–28 cm (10–11 in) in length, has a wingspan of 47–53 cm (19–21 in) and weighs 100–156 g (3.5–5.5 oz). It can be recognised by its brown colouring and the black-and-white-striped patch on the side of its neck. When the bird flies from the observer, the tail is notable as it is wedge-shaped with a dark centre and white borders and tips. When viewed from below, the pattern, due to the white under-tail coverts obscuring the dark bases, resembles a blackish chevron on a white background. This can be seen when the bird stoops to drink and raises its spread tail.

The mature bird has a blue-grey head, neck, flanks, and rump, and cinnamon-coloured wings that are mottled with black. The breast is vinaceous and the abdomen and undertail coverts are white. Its bill is black and its legs and eye rings are red. The black and white patch on the side of the neck is absent in the browner and duller juvenile bird, which also has brown legs.

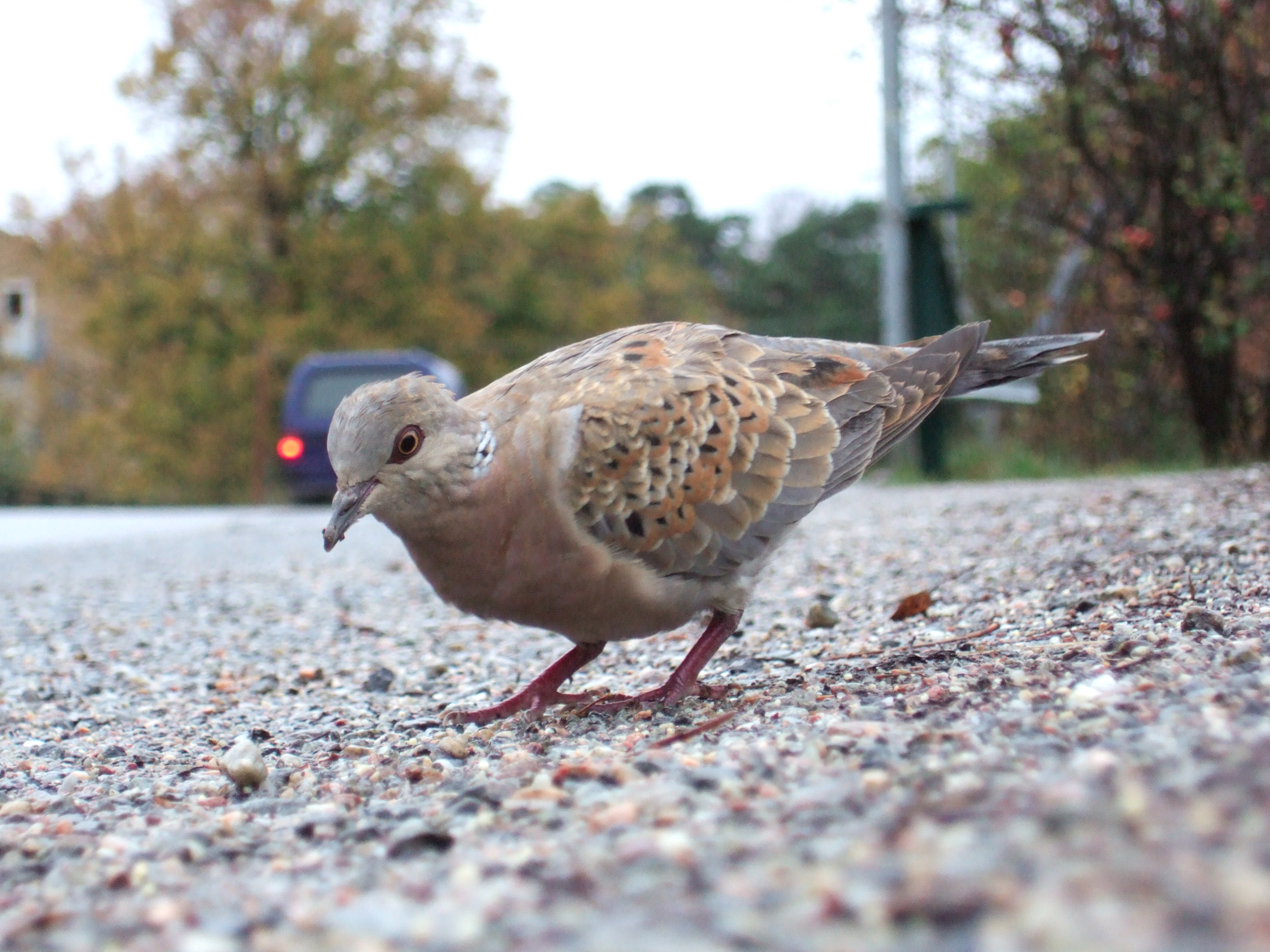
Juvenile in Nynäshamn, Sweden

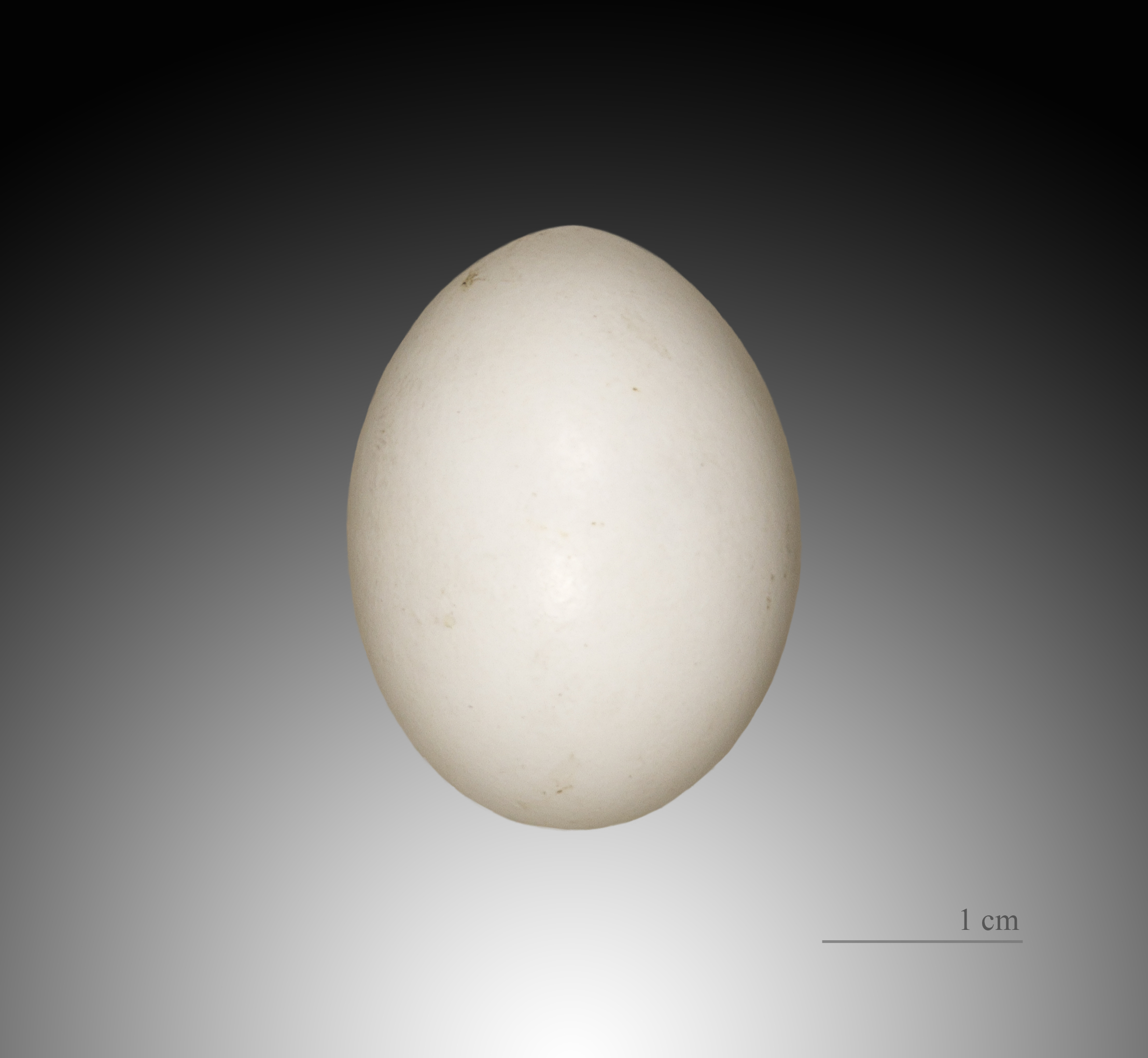

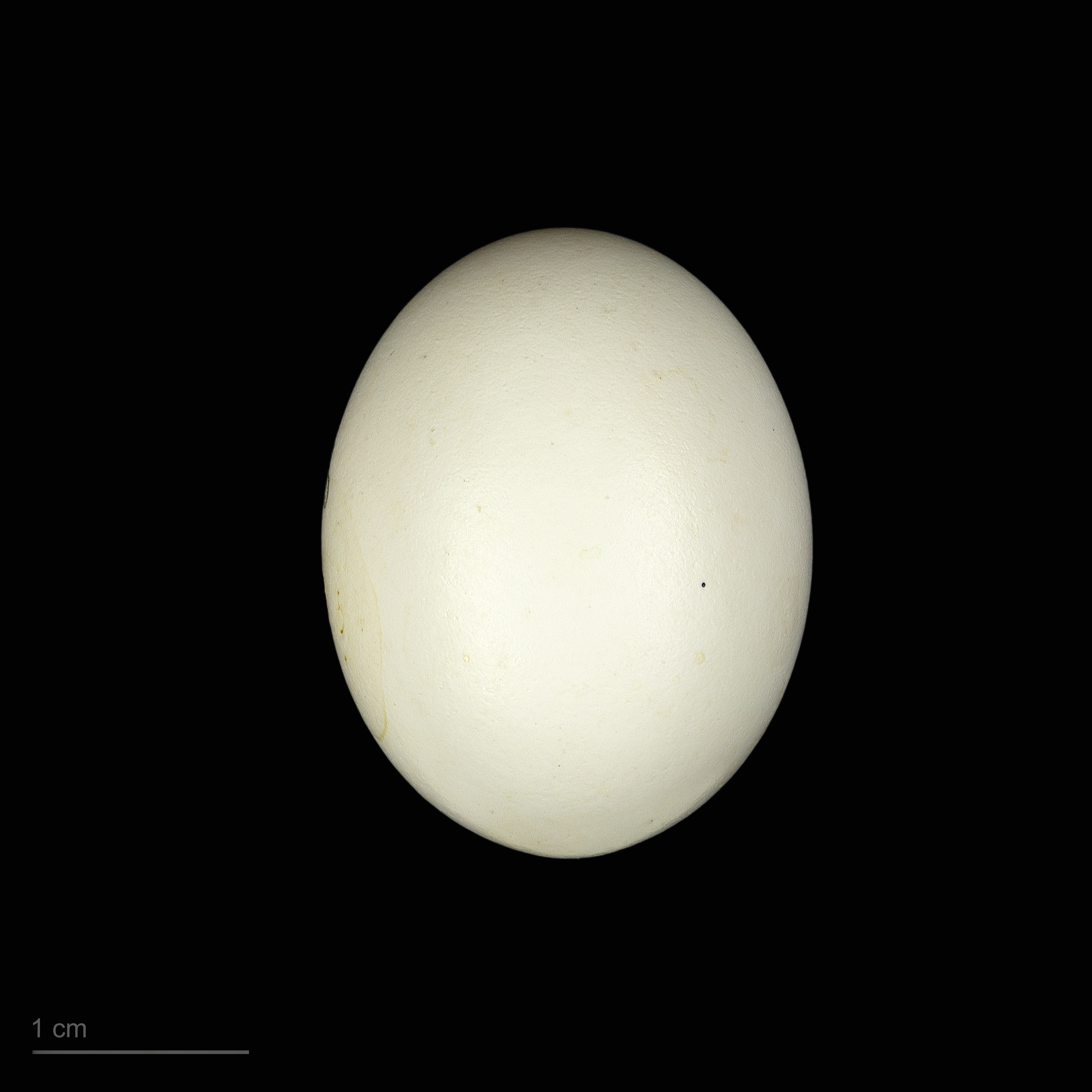
Streptopelia turtur arenicola - MHNT

== Distribution and habitat ==
The turtle dove is a migratory species with a western Palearctic range covering most of Europe and the Middle East and including Turkey and north Africa, although it is rare in northern Scandinavia and Russia. It winters south of the Sahara. It is one of the latest migrants, rarely appearing in Northern Europe before the end of April and returning south again in September. Turtle doves are rare vagrants in North America, with records from Massachusetts and Florida in the United States, and an additional record from Saint Pierre and Miquelon.

This bird prefers open woodlands to dense ones, and often feeds on the ground. Although it occasionally nests in large gardens, it is usually extremely timid, probably due to the heavy hunting pressure it faces during migration. Its flight is often described as arrow-like, but it is not particularly fast.

The nuptial flight, high and circling, is like that of the common wood pigeon, but the undulations are less decided; it is accompanied by the whip-crack of the downward flicked wings. The arrival in spring is heralded by its cooing or purring song, a rather deep, vibrating "turrr, turrr".

== Status ==
Turtle dove populations are in rapid decline across Europe and this species has a red-listed global conservation status. In the United Kingdom its numbers have declined by 93% since 1994, and across Europe numbers fell by 78% during the 1980–2013 period.

Environmentalist groups have attributed the decline of turtle doves in Europe to two main factors: changes in farming practices which have led to a decrease in the availability of weed seeds and shoots, especially fumitory, on which the birds feed; and the shooting of birds in Mediterranean countries. According to a 2001 study cited by the European Commission, between two and four million turtle doves are shot annually in Malta, Cyprus, France, Italy, Spain and Greece. Environmentalists have described spring hunting in Malta as particularly problematic as it is the only country with an EU derogation to shoot birds during their spring migration to breeding grounds.

According to a 2007 study by the European Commission, four currently identifiable potential threats to the turtle dove are (1) habitat loss/modification (medium to low impact), (2) droughts and climate change (mostly unknown but likely low impact), (3) hunting (partly unknown but overall medium impact), and (4) competition with the collared dove (unknown impact). The British Trust for Ornithology has also highlighted Trichomonosis parasites as a threat to the turtle dove.

In 2021, the European Commission recommended a temporary hunting ban, which was enforced in the western Mediterranean countries of France, Spain and Portugal. Following the hunting moratorium, the western European breeding population increased by approximately 47% between 2021 and 2025. Populations in central and eastern European breeding grounds, however, have continued to decline as hunting continued in these areas, albeit on a smaller scale.

This recommendation was lifted in April 2025 over the western flyway, with restrictions on the number of birds allowed to be taken, as the agreed conditions required to resume hunting had been met.

== In culture ==
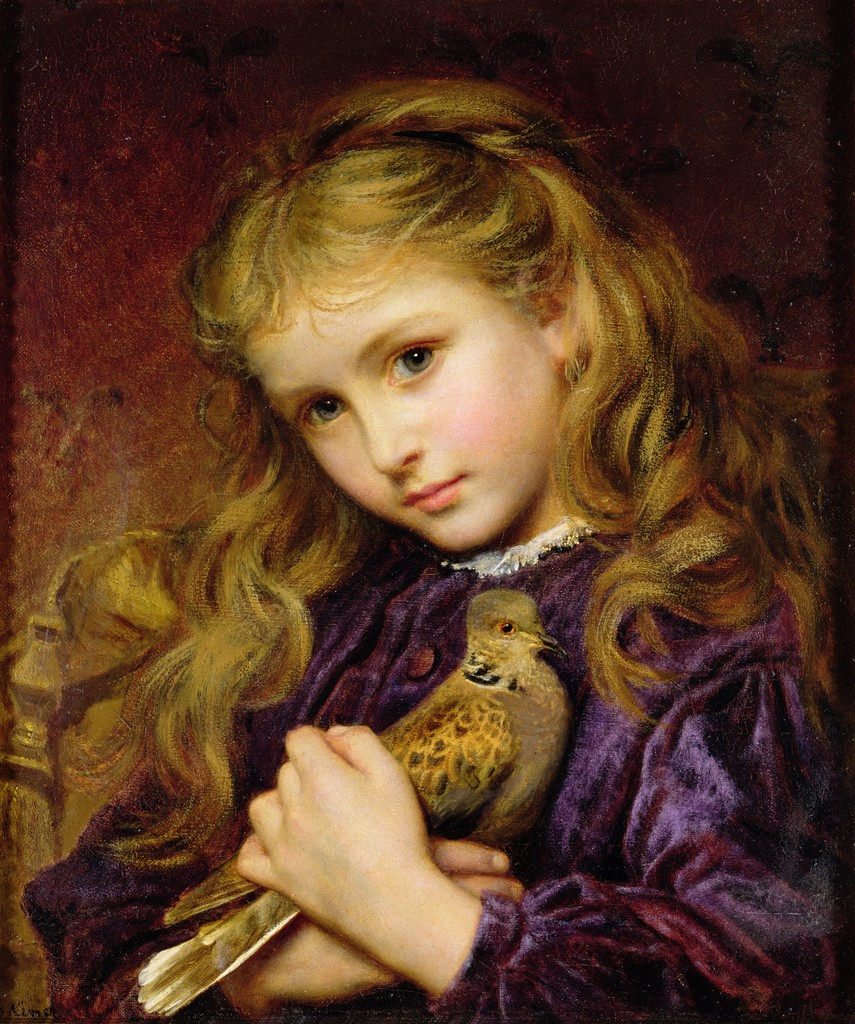
The Turtle Dove by Sophie Gengembre Anderson

According to Aelian, the turtle dove was sacred to Demeter. In Roman mythology, the turtle dove was one of the emblems of Fides, the goddess of trust and good faith.

Perhaps because of Biblical references – especially verse 2:12 from the Song of Songs "the voice of the turtle [dove] is heard in our land" – its mournful voice, and the fact that it forms strong pair bonds, European turtle doves have become emblems of devoted love. In the New Testament, two turtle doves are mentioned as the customary offering during the Presentation of Jesus at the Temple. In Renaissance Europe, the European turtle dove was envisaged as the devoted partner of the Phoenix. Robert Chester's poem Love's Martyr is a sustained exploration of this symbolism. It was published along with other poems on the subject, including William Shakespeare's poem "The Phoenix and the Turtle", where "turtle" refers to the turtle dove.

The turtle dove is featured in a number of folk songs about love and loss, including "There Is a Tavern in the Town". One of these is among the folk song settings of Ralph Vaughan Williams.

Turtle doves are also featured in the song "The Twelve Days of Christmas", as the gift "my true love gave to me" on the second and subsequent days of Christmas.

Turtle doves appear in the title and lyrics of the spiritual "Turtledove Done Drooped His Wings" from the Georgia Sea Islands.

In the Shaker hymn "In Yonder Valley", that "the turtledove is in our land" is seen as a good omen and sign of growth.

== Sources ==
- Cramp, Stanley, ed. (1985). "Streptopelia turtur Turtle dove". Handbook of the Birds of Europe the Middle East and North Africa. The Birds of the Western Palearctic. Volume IV: Terns to Woodpeckers. Oxford: Oxford University Press. pp. 353–363. ISBN 978-0-19-857507-8.
- Jobling, James A. (2010). The Helm Dictionary of Scientific Bird Names. London: Christopher Helm. ISBN 978-1-4081-2501-4.
