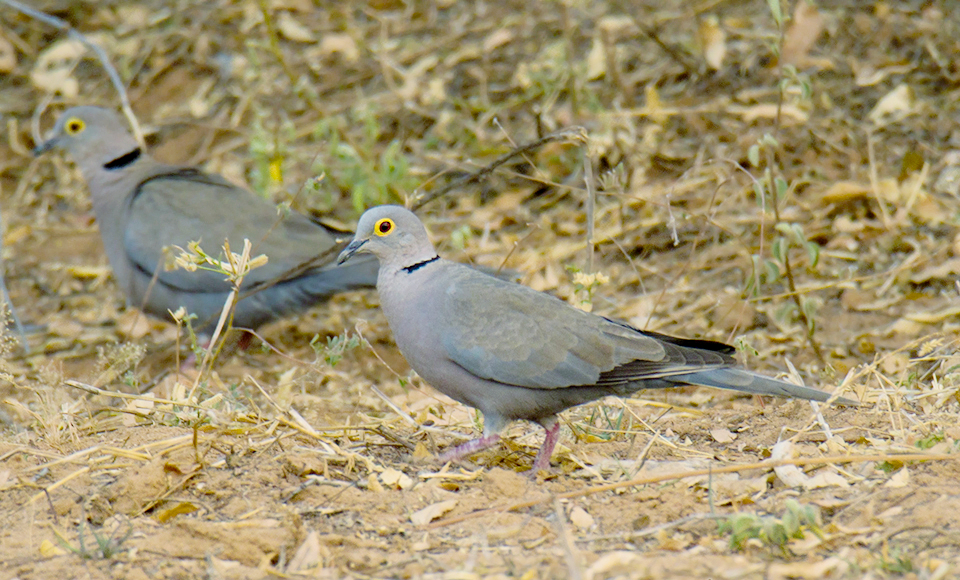

Conservation status
- Least Concern (IUCN 3.1)

Scientific classification
- Kingdom: Animalia
- Phylum: Chordata
- Class: Aves
- Order: Columbiformes
- Family: Columbidae
- Genus: Streptopelia
- Species: S. xanthocycla

Binomial name
- Streptopelia xanthocycla (Newman, TH, 1906)

= Burmese collared dove =

Species of bird

The Burmese collared dove (Streptopelia xanthocycla) is a species of bird in the family Columbidae. It was formerly considered a subspecies of the Eurasian collared dove (S. decaocto). It differs from Eurasian collared dove in having a bright yellow eye ring (as opposed to pale grey to whitish), and slightly darker plumage. It is the same 30–32 cm length as the Eurasian collared dove. The song is a two note coo, unlike the three note coo of the Eurasian collared dove.

Published distribution maps show it as endemic to the Irrawaddy River basin in central Myanmar. It has also been reported from adjacent China, though without firm evidence.
