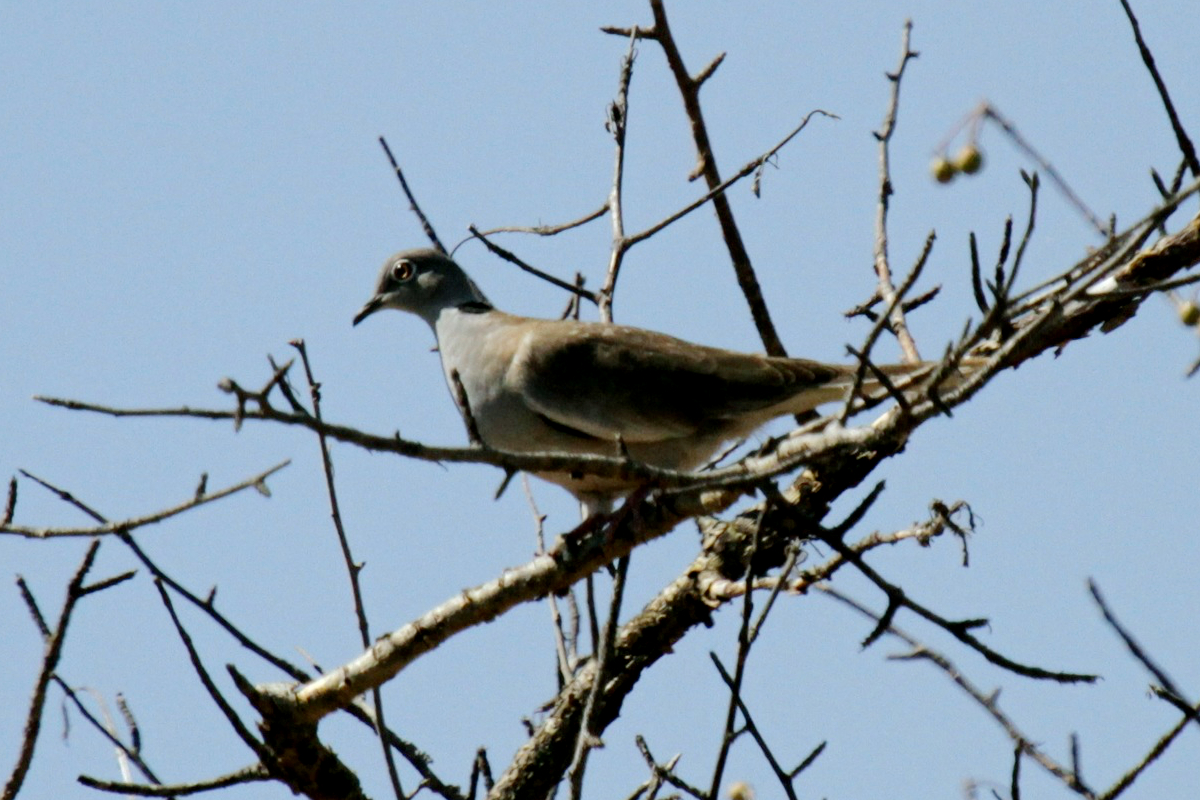

Conservation status
- Least Concern (IUCN 3.1)

Scientific classification
- Kingdom: Animalia
- Phylum: Chordata
- Class: Aves
- Order: Columbiformes
- Family: Columbidae
- Genus: Streptopelia
- Species: S. reichenowi

Binomial name
- Streptopelia reichenowi (Erlanger, 1901)

= White-winged collared dove =

Species of bird

The white-winged collared dove or white-winged dove (Streptopelia reichenowi) is a species of bird in the family Columbidae. Its natural habitats are subtropical or tropical moist lowland forest, subtropical or tropical dry shrubland, plantations and urban areas in Ethiopia, Kenya, and Somalia.
