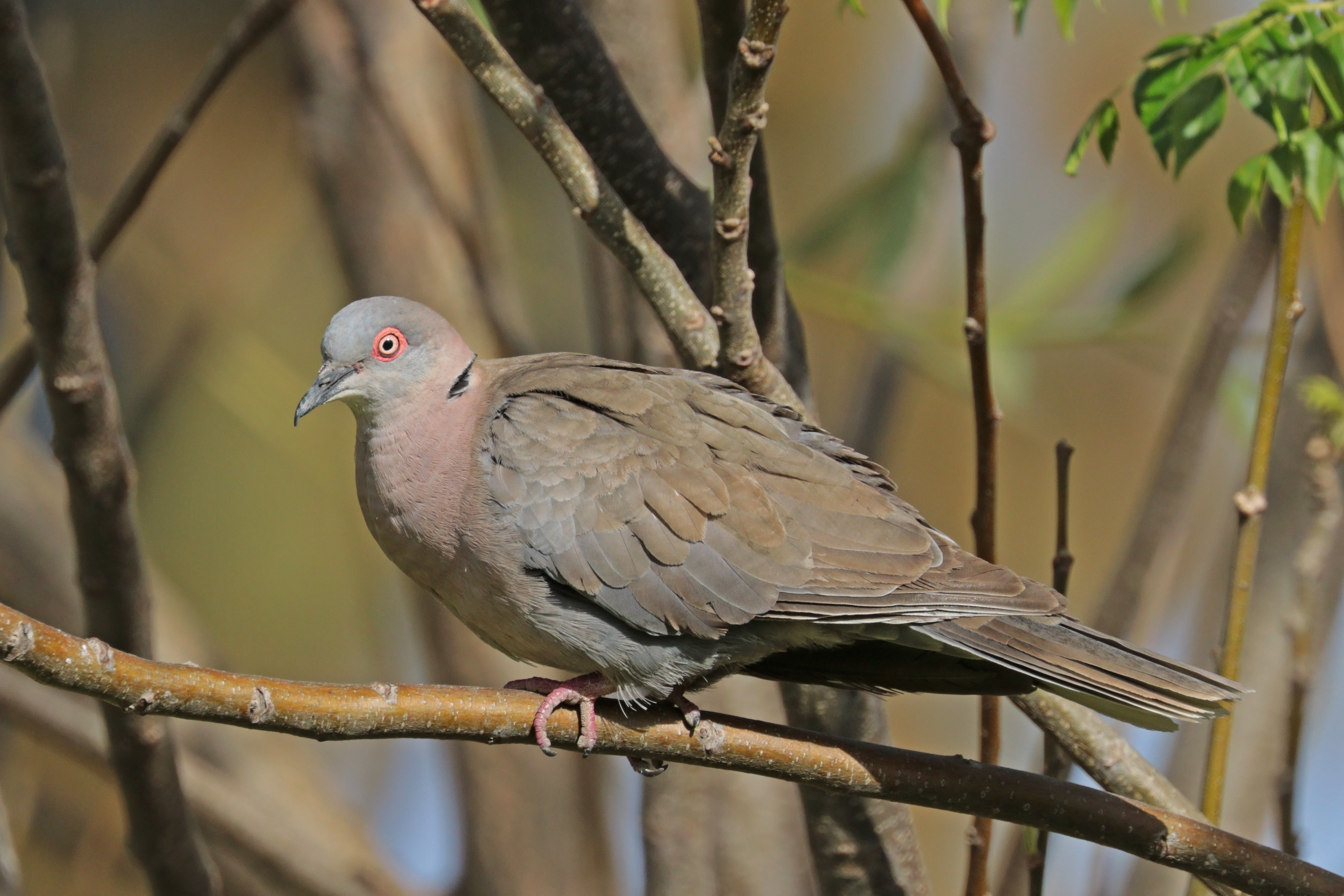
- S. d. decipiens in Ethiopia

Conservation status
- Least Concern (IUCN 3.1)

Scientific classification
- Kingdom: Animalia
- Phylum: Chordata
- Class: Aves
- Order: Columbiformes
- Family: Columbidae
- Genus: Streptopelia
- Species: S. decipiens

Binomial name
- Streptopelia decipiens (Hartlaub & Finsch, 1870)

= Mourning collared dove =

Species of bird

The mourning collared dove or African mourning dove (Streptopelia decipiens) is a dove which is a widespread resident breeding bird in Africa south of the Sahara. This species is common or abundant near water. It often mingles peacefully with other doves. Despite its name, it is not closely related to the North American mourning dove (Zenaida macroura).

== Description ==
The mourning collared dove is a medium-sized, stocky pigeon, 28–30 cm in length. It has a pale grey head and pinkish-grey body, with a broad black half-collar finely edged in white on the back and sides of the neck. The wings are broad and pointed, pale brown with darker brown flight feathers. The legs, and a patch of bare skin around the eye, are red, and the iris is pale yellow to brownish. When flying, it shows dark flight feathers and extensive white in the tail, the latter being a distinction from the similar but slightly larger red-eyed dove; this also differs in having a red iris.

The sexes are similar, but immatures are duller than adults, and have scalloping on the body feathers.

== Taxonomy ==
Six subspecies are accepted:

- Streptopelia decipiens shelleyi (Salvadori, AT, 1893) — Mauritania and Senegambia to southern Niger and central Nigeria
- Streptopelia decipiens logonensis (Reichenow, A, 1921) — Lake Chad basin to southern Sudan, eastern Democratic Republic of the Congo, and northern and western Uganda
- Streptopelia decipiens decipiens (Hartlaub, KJG; Finsch, FHO, 1870) — eastern Sudan (Darfur) to Ethiopia and northwestern Somalia
- Streptopelia decipiens elegans (Zedlitz, OE, 1913) — southern Ethiopia to southern Somalia and eastern Kenya
- Streptopelia decipiens perspicillata (Fischer, GA; Reichenow, A, 1884) — western Kenya and central Tanzania
- Streptopelia decipiens ambigua (Bocage, JVB, 1881) — eastern Angola to southeastern Democratic Republic of the Congo, Zambia, Malawi, and the Limpopo Valley

The subspecies differ in the tone and intensity of the body colour, and in the iris colour.

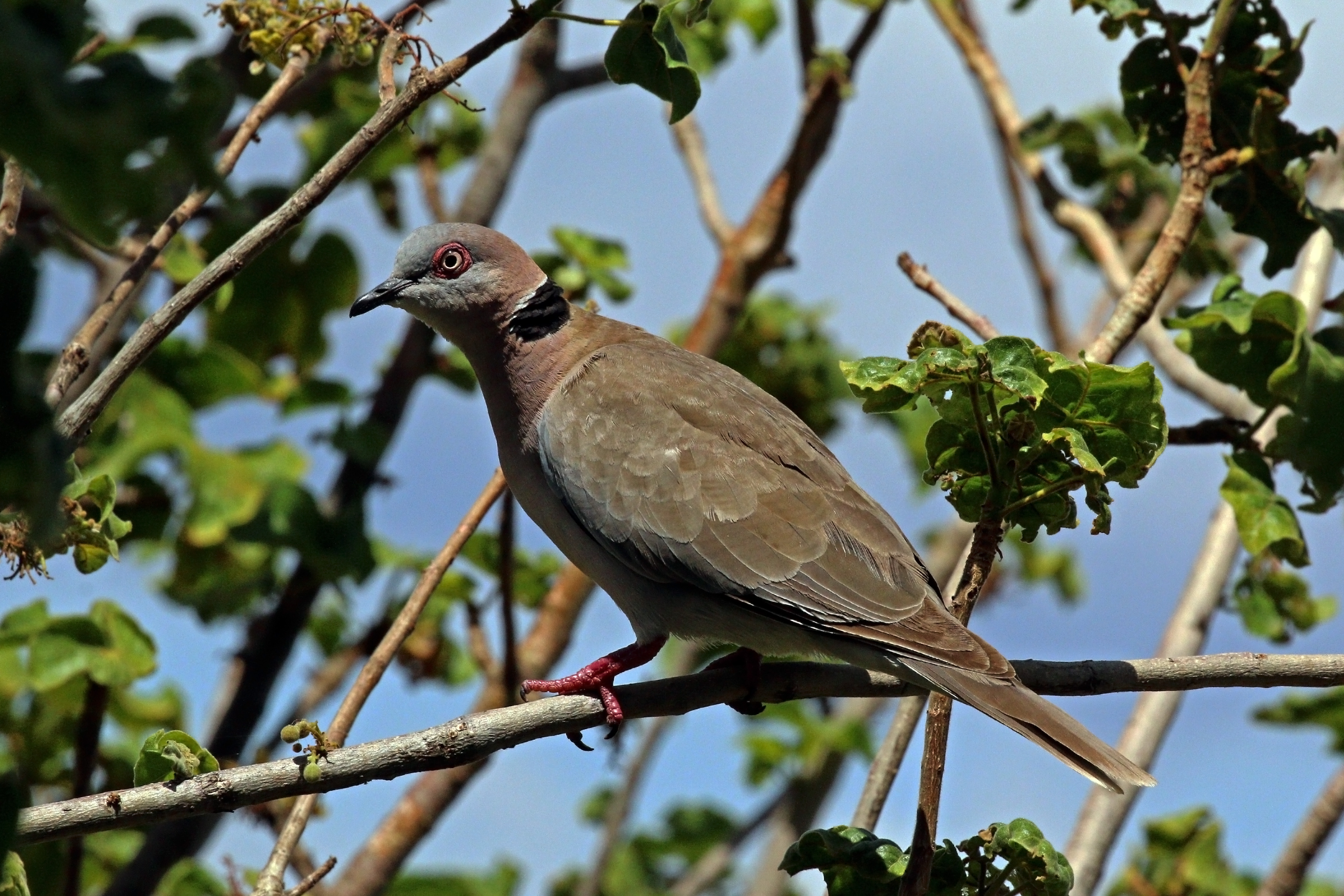
S. d. perspicillata, Lake Baringo, Kenya

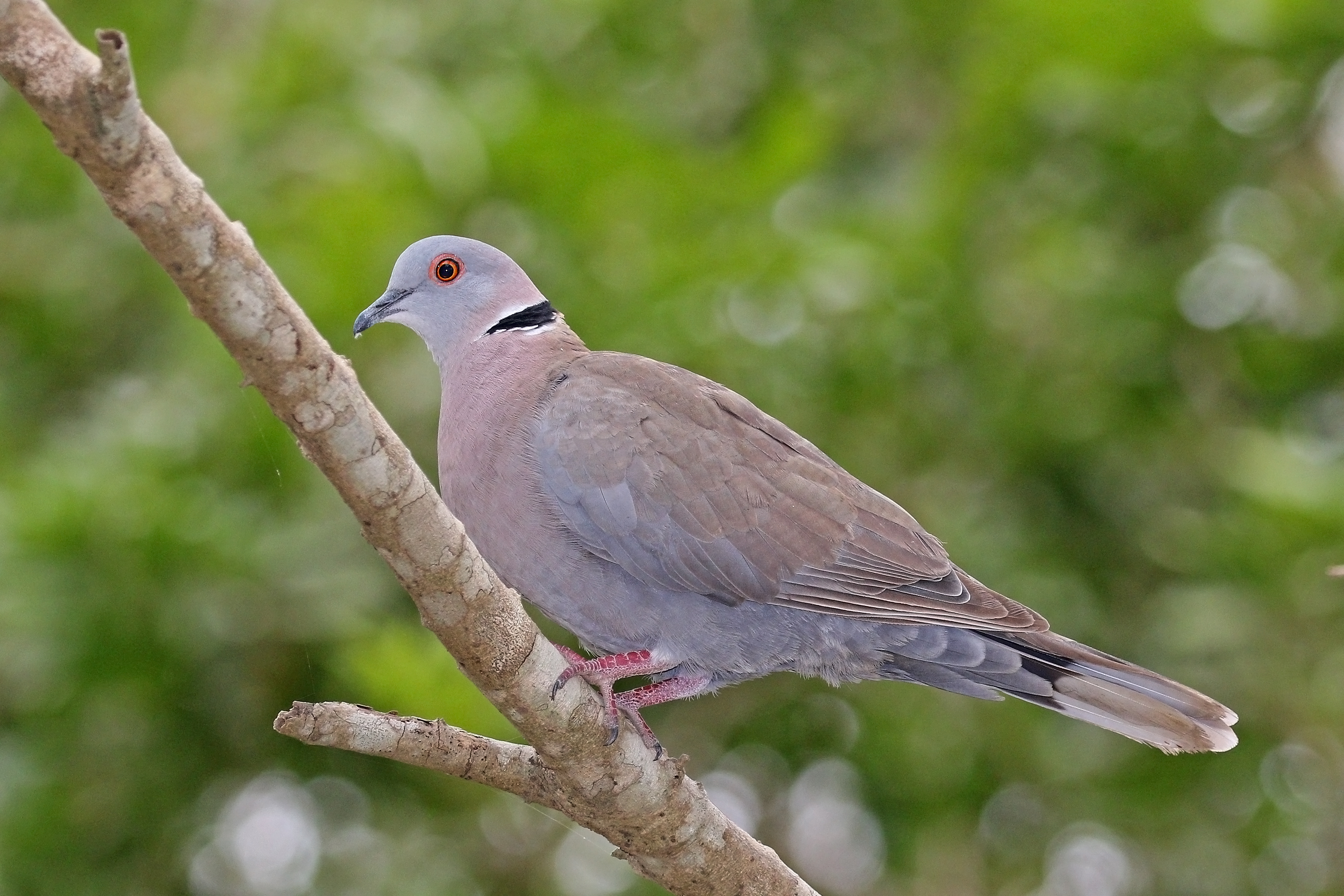
S. d. shelleyi, Gambia

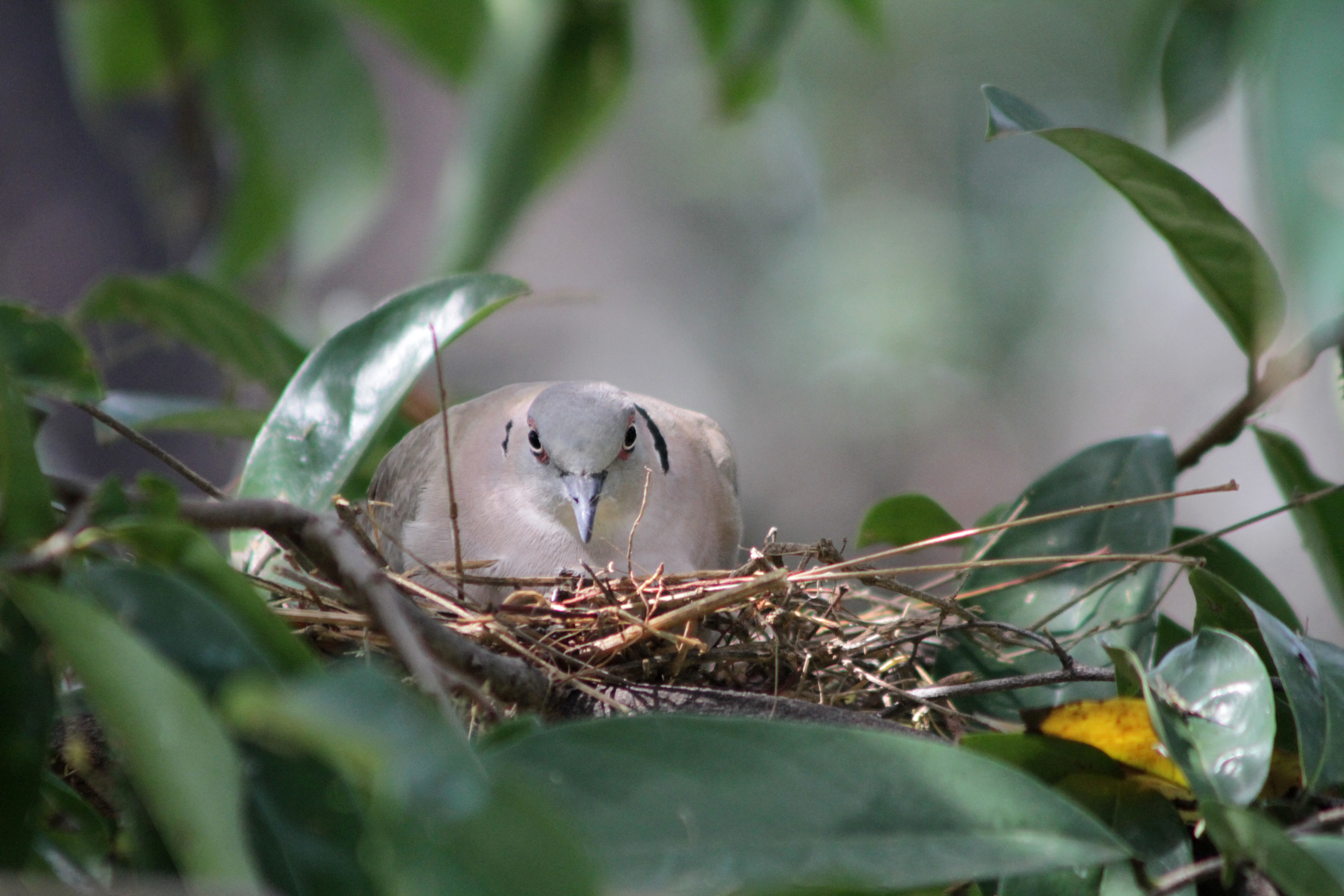
on a nest near Lake Baringo, Kenya

== Behaviour ==
The flight is quick, with the regular beats and an occasional sharp flick of the wings which are characteristic of pigeons in general.

=== Diet and feeding ===
Mourning collared doves eat grass seeds, grain and other vegetation. They are quite terrestrial, and usually forage on the ground. They are quite gregarious and often feed in groups.

=== Sounds ===
The call is a deep, nasal note that sounds along the lines of kuk-koooo-kuk. This call pattern is flat and considered a hoot.

=== Reproduction ===
These birds typically mate monogamously and the timing in which they mate depends on location. For example, breeding occurs from December to June in Sudan, but September to October in Chad, and in Senegal and Gambia, breeding occurs throughout the year. They tend to build a stick nest in low tree branch or bush, preferably closer to the ground, often a mangrove. A clutch of two white eggs that are laid. The eggs need to be incubated for 13–14 days, which is done by both male and female, with the young fledging after 15–18 days.
