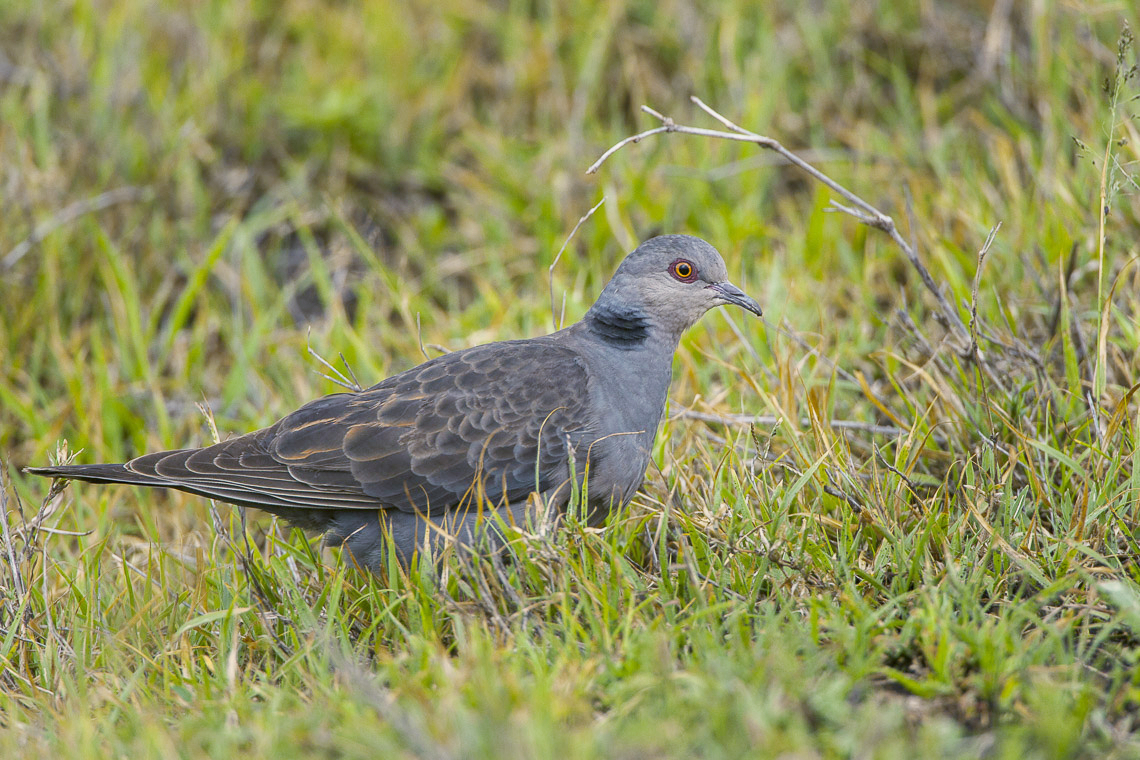

Conservation status
- Least Concern (IUCN 3.1)

Scientific classification
- Kingdom: Animalia
- Phylum: Chordata
- Class: Aves
- Order: Columbiformes
- Family: Columbidae
- Genus: Streptopelia
- Species: S. lugens

Binomial name
- Streptopelia lugens (Rüppell, 1837)

Synonyms
- Turtur lugens; Columba lugens; Peristera lugens

= Dusky turtle dove =

Species of bird

The dusky turtle dove or pink-breasted turtle dove (Streptopelia lugens) is a species of bird in the family Columbidae.

== Description ==
The dusky turtle dove is a very dark or slaty-grey dove, generally 28–30 centimetres long, and weighs 120–205 g; the males (140–205 g) slightly heavier than the females (120–190 g).

It has a grey face slightly paler than the body, conspicuous black patches on sides of the neck, and wing coverts and tertials with pale brown or rufous edges. Its eye is orange or orange-yellow with a purplish eye-ring. Its bill is purplish slate-grey. Its legs are red. Juvenile birds are paler and browner than adults.

== Taxonomy ==
Dusky turtle dove is monotypic, with no subspecies described. Its closest relative is the Adamawa turtle dove S. hypopyrrha, which replaces it in West Africa; that species is slightly larger (30–31 cm) with a paler silvery-grey head and orange-toned belly; the two were formerly often considered conspecific. These two together are then most closely related to the European turtle dove S. turtur, which breeds much further north but winters in the same area; that species is much paler and more orange-toned overall.

== Distribution and habitat ==
The dusky turtle dove is found in East Africa, occurring in Eritrea, Somalia, southern Sudan, Ethiopia, Uganda, Tanzania, Malawi, Burundi, Democratic Republic of the Congo, and with a disjunct population in South Arabia in Yemen and southern Saudi Arabia.

It inhabits the Afrotropical Highlands Biome, in montane forest, forest edge, and woodland garden, between 1,800 and 3,200 metres altitude. The preferred habitat is woodland with African juniper, hagenia, and bamboo, but it also uses plantations of exotic trees including eucalyptus and pine, and cultivated land.

It is largely sedentary, but with some evidence of vagrancy; in Ethiopia, birds have been recorded as low as 200 m altitude during the rainy season.

== Ecology and behaviour ==
The diet consists of seeds, insects, and molluscs, foraged from the ground. It is active during the day (diurnal) and is usually solitary or in small groups, but outside of the breeding season, in flocks of up to 100.

The breeding season is mainly during the dry season, but is long, with nests recorded in all but the wettest periods (in Ethiopia, July and August). It is socially monogamous. The female probably builds the nest, a loose platform of twigs lined with rootlets, usually in a tree, often a juniper, 2-7 m above the ground. The clutch is two eggs. Both male and female incubate the eggs (20 days) and tend the nestlings (possibly 14–16 days).
