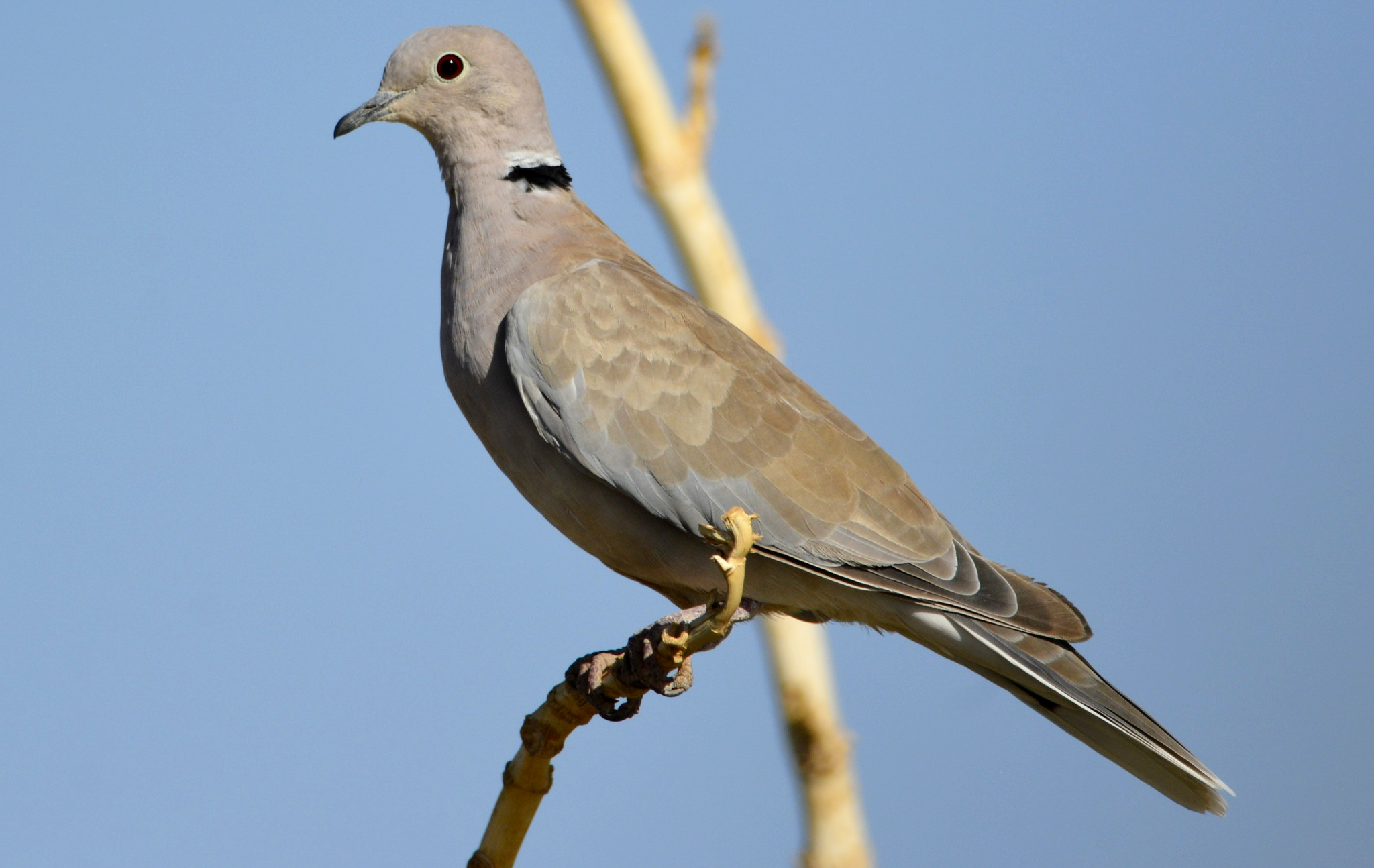
- African collared dove at Timiaouine in southern Algeria

Conservation status
- Least Concern (IUCN 3.1)

Scientific classification
- Kingdom: Animalia
- Phylum: Chordata
- Class: Aves
- Order: Columbiformes
- Family: Columbidae
- Genus: Streptopelia
- Species: S. roseogrisea

Binomial name
- Streptopelia roseogrisea (Sundevall, 1857)
- Global range Extant (Resident) Extant (Breeding) Extant & introduced (Resident)

Synonyms
- Streptopelia risoria

= African collared dove =

Species of bird

The African collared dove (Streptopelia roseogrisea) is a small dove found in the Sahel, northern parts of the Horn of Africa and southwestern Arabia. Although it lives in arid lands, it is found around water sources.

This bird is typically around 26 cm (10 in) in length and 130–166 g weight. Its upper body, from shoulders to tail, is a pale greyish brown, though the wing edge has a bluish tinge. The flight feathers are darker, and nearly black. The head, neck and breast are pinkish shading to white on the chin and belly. There is no sexual dimorphism.

Two subspecies are currently accepted, though the genetic difference is minimal and the species may be better considered monotypic.

- Streptopelia roseogrisea roseogrisea — nominate subspecies; across Africa in the Sahel region just south of the Sahara Desert east to north-central Sudan
- Streptopelia roseogrisea arabica (Neumann, 1904) — northeast Sudan to Eritrea and Somalia, and southwestern Arabia; slightly darker than nominate
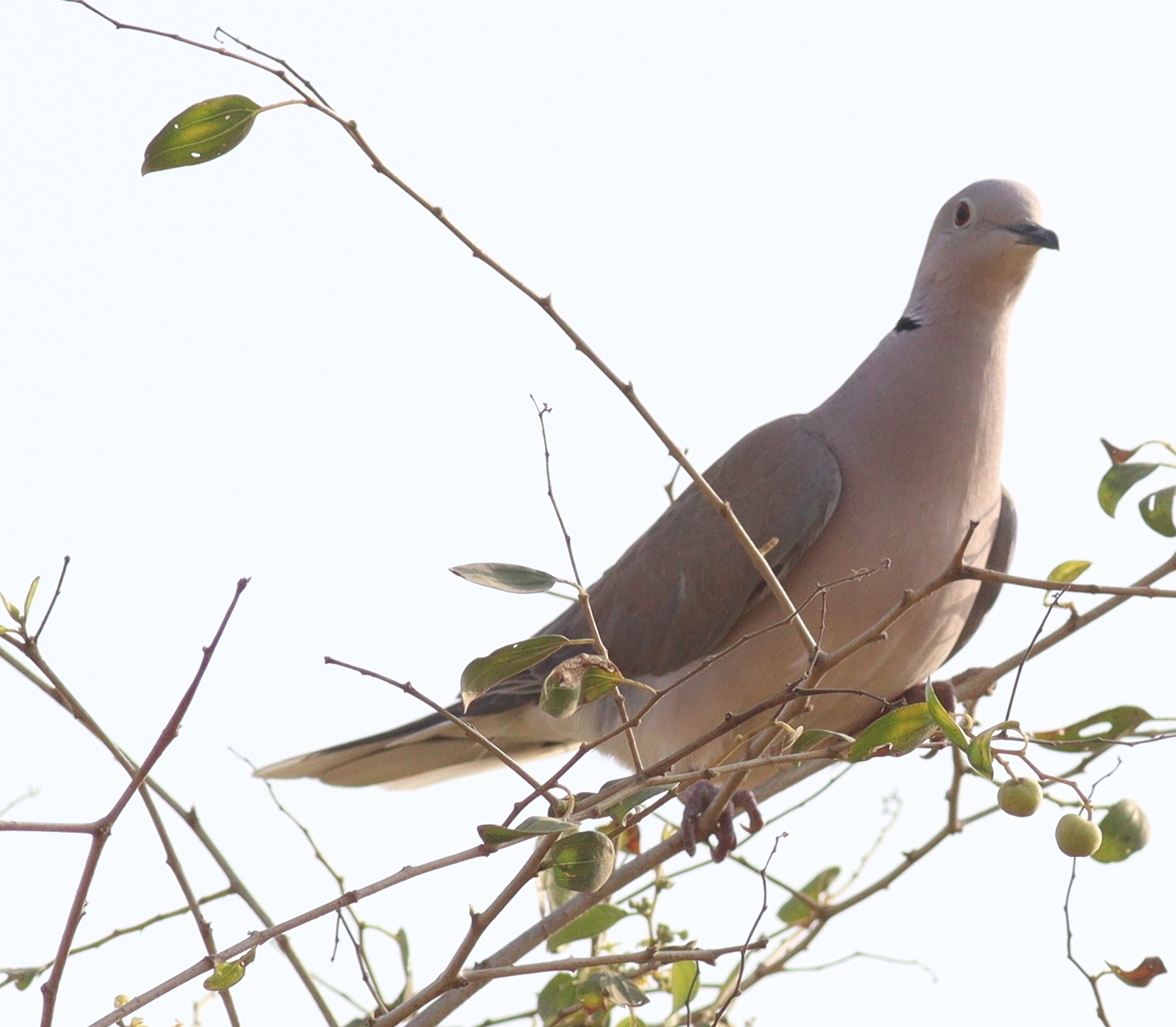
S. r. arabica, Sabya, Saudi Arabia

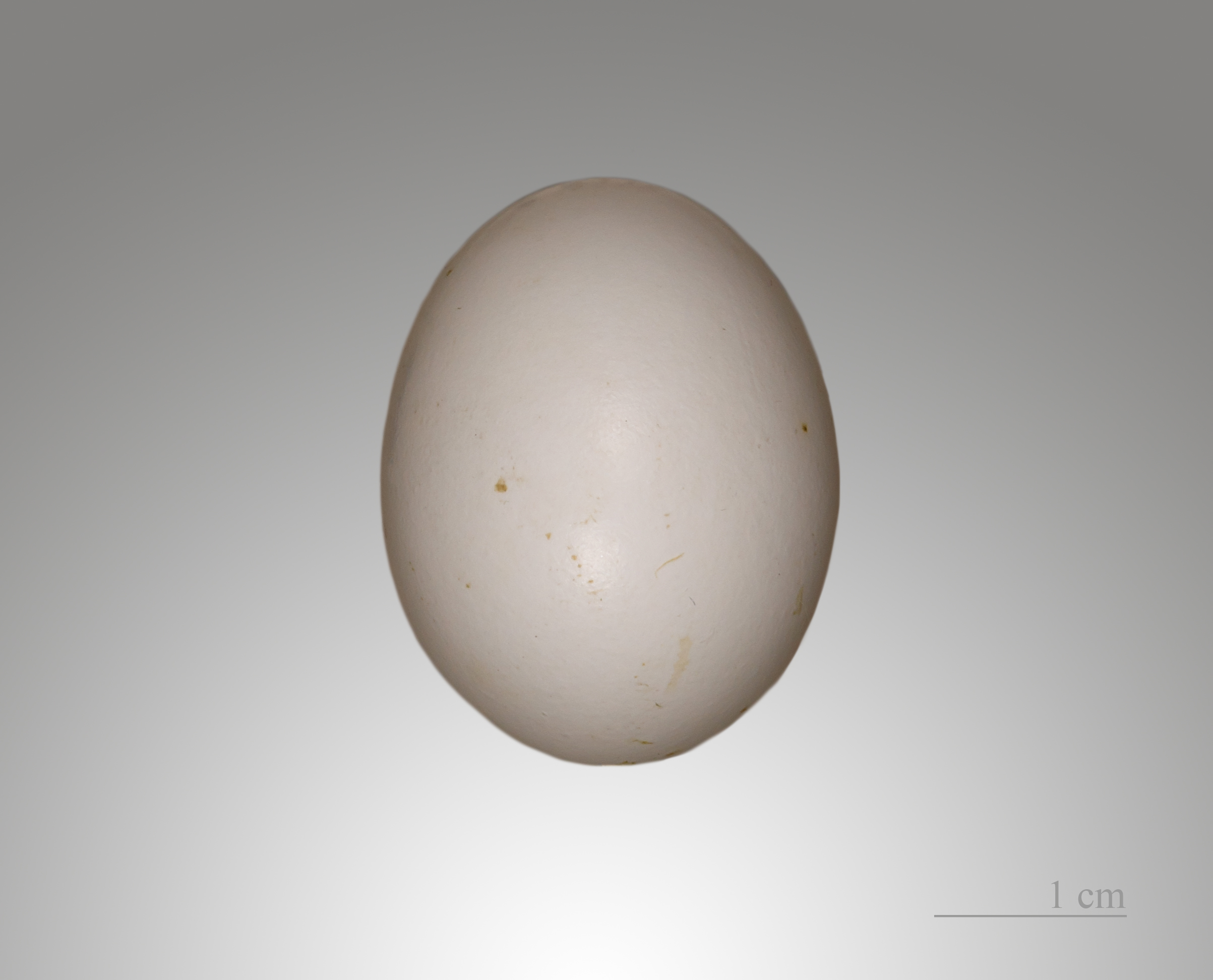
African Collared Dove egg

The African collared dove is the wild ancestor of the domestic Barbary dove; some in the past have suggested that the Eurasian collared dove (Streptopelia decaocto) may also have been involved, but there is only minimal evidence to support this. The African collared dove is able to interbreed with the Barbary dove, and it is thought that the increase in the range of colours of Barbary doves available that occurred in the later 20th century was the result of the importation of African collared doves into the United States for interbreeding.

It has a diet of grass seeds and other plants. They would also eat berries, insects, and snails.
