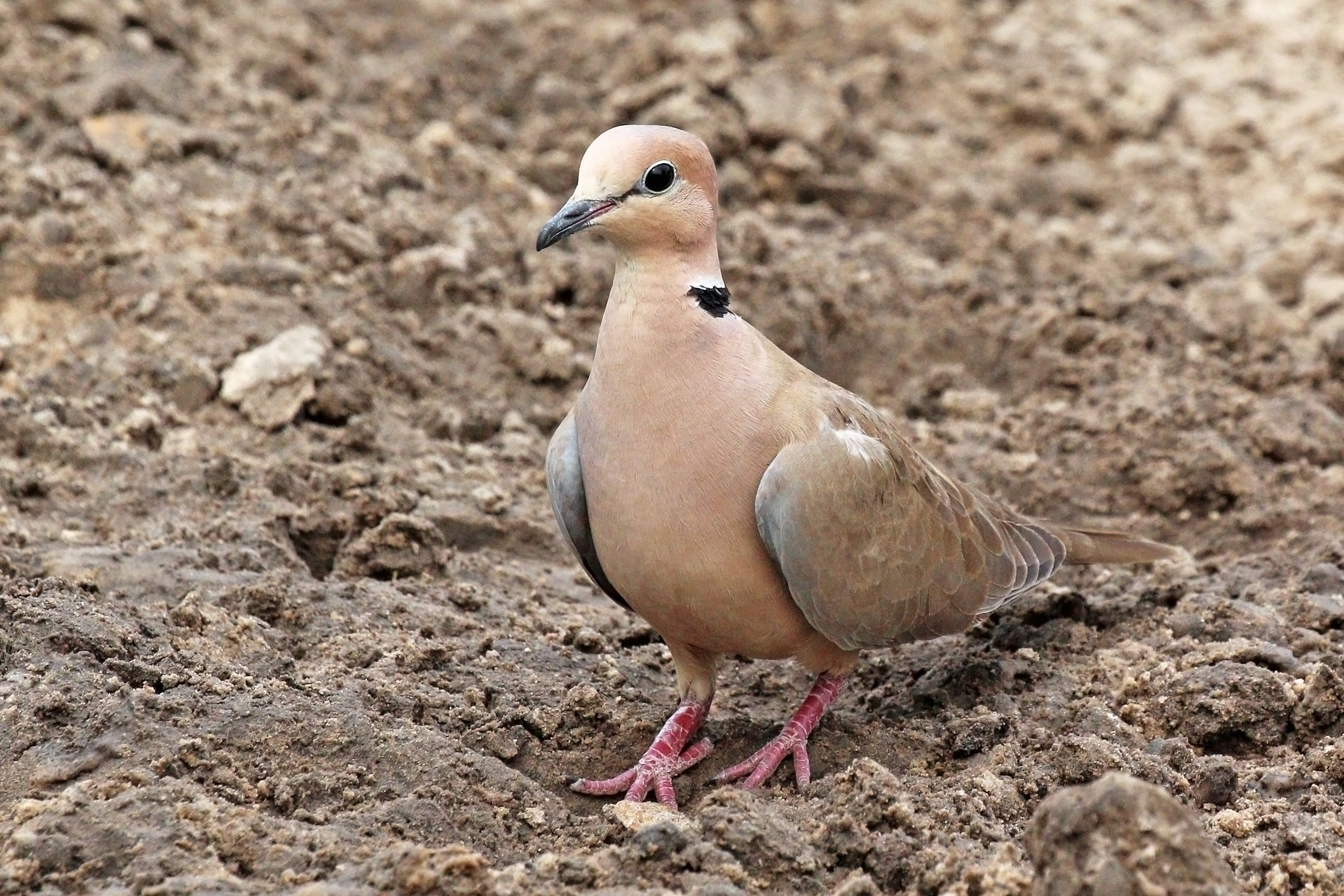
- In Senegal

Conservation status
- Least Concern (IUCN 3.1)

Scientific classification
- Kingdom: Animalia
- Phylum: Chordata
- Class: Aves
- Order: Columbiformes
- Family: Columbidae
- Genus: Streptopelia
- Species: S. vinacea

Binomial name
- Streptopelia vinacea (Gmelin, JF, 1789)

= Vinaceous dove =

Species of bird

The vinaceous dove (Streptopelia vinacea) is a bird species in the pigeon family Columbidae that widely resident across northern Sub-Saharan Africa.

== Taxonomy ==
The vinaceous dove was formally described in 1789 by German naturalist Johann Friedrich Gmelin in his revised and expanded edition of Carl Linnaeus's Systema Naturae. He placed it with all the other doves and pigeons in the genus Columba and coined the binomial name Columba vinacea. Gmelin based his description on the earlier publications by French ornithologists Mathurin Jacques Brisson and Georges-Louis Leclerc, Comte de Buffon. The vinaceous dove is now placed with 14 other species in the genus Streptopelia that was introduced in 1855 by French ornithologist Charles Lucien Bonaparte. The genus name is from the Ancient Greek στρεπτός (streptós) – literal meaning "twisted", but by extension, "wearing a torc" (i.e., twisted metal collar) – and πέλεια (péleia) meaning "wild dove". The specific vinacea is from Latin vinaceus, meaning "of wine" or "vinaceous". The species is monotypic; no subspecies are recognized.

== Description ==
The vinaceous dove is a small, stocky pigeon, typically 26 to 30 centimeters (10.2 to 11.8 inches) in length and 130 to 180 grams (4.6 to 6.3 ounces) in weight. Its back, wings, and tail are pale brown. When flying, it shows a blackish underwing. The head and the underparts are pale pinkish-grey, and it has a black hind-neck patch edged with white. The legs are red, with white in the tail. Sexes are similar, but juveniles are duller than adults. The call is a fast coo-cu-cu-coo. They can live about 3 to 5 years in the wild.

It builds a stick nest in a tree, often an acacia, and lays two white eggs. Its flight is quick, with the regular beats and an occasional sharp flick of the wings is characteristic of pigeons in general.

== Distribution and habitat ==
The vinaceous dove is a common bird that is found in central and western African countries such as Senegal, Gambia, Burkina Faso, Benin, and Nigeria.

This species is abundant in scrub and savannah.

== Diet ==
Vinaceous doves usually eat seeds, fruits, and sometimes small insects. They are quite terrestrial, and usually forage on the ground. Unlike several other species in this genus, they are very gregarious and often feed in large group, frequently with other doves.
