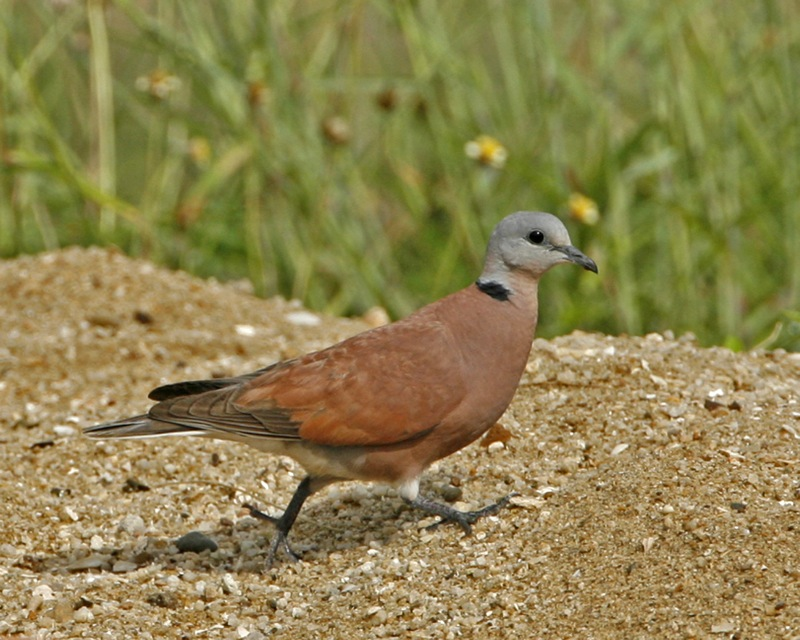
- Male in Singapore

Conservation status
- Least Concern (IUCN 3.1)

Scientific classification
- Kingdom: Animalia
- Phylum: Chordata
- Class: Aves
- Order: Columbiformes
- Family: Columbidae
- Genus: Streptopelia
- Species: S. tranquebarica

Binomial name
- Streptopelia tranquebarica (Hermann, 1804)

= Red collared dove =

Species of bird

The red collared dove (Streptopelia tranquebarica), also known as the red turtle dove, is a small pigeon which is a resident breeding bird in the tropics of Asia. The male has a blue-grey head and a red-brown body. The female is much plainer, with pale brown plumage similar to that of the larger Eurasian collared dove.

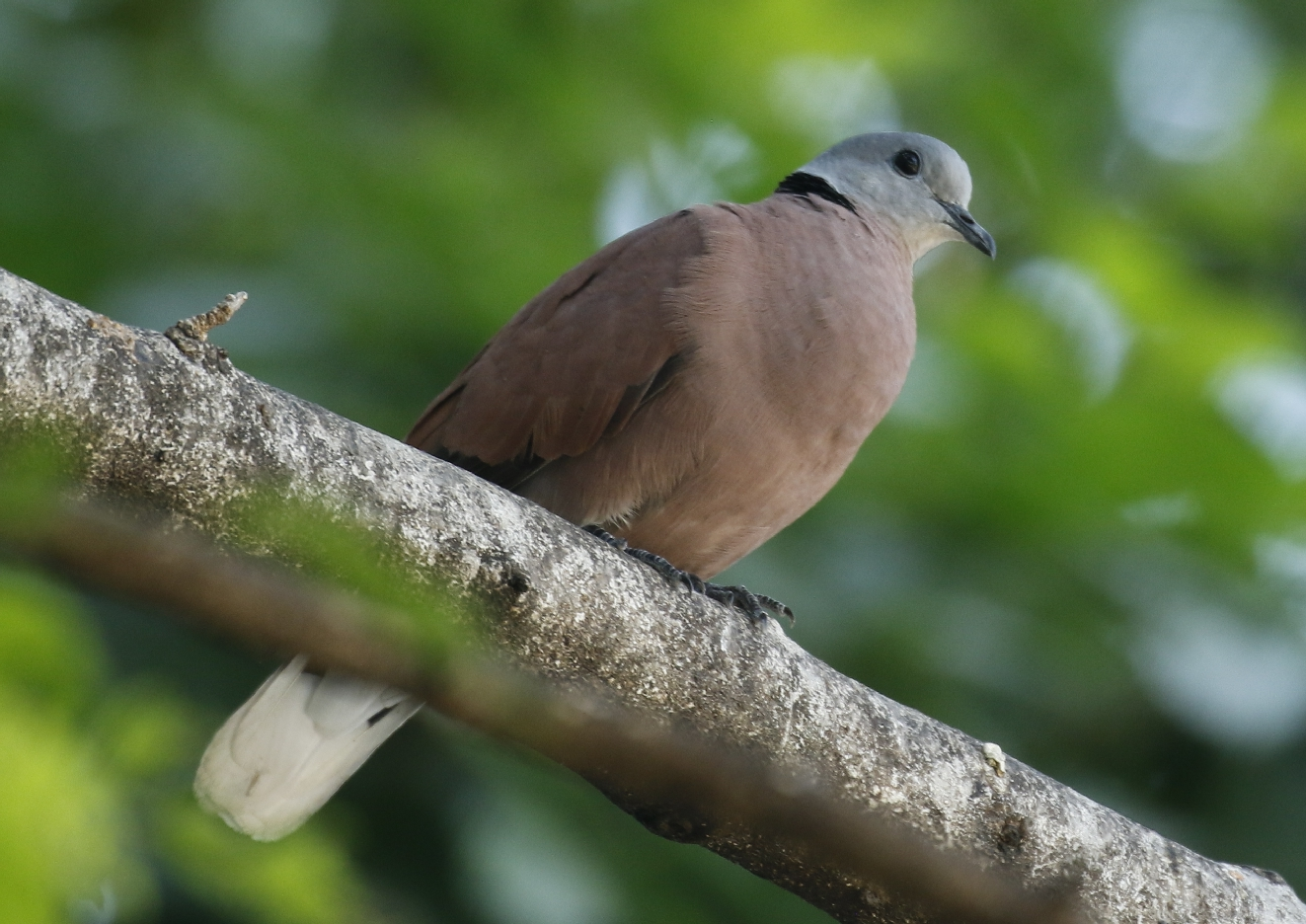
Novotel - Bangkok

== Taxonomy ==
The red collared dove was formally described by the French naturalist Johann Hermann in 1804 and given the binomial name Columba tranquebarica. The specific epithet is from the town Tranquebar, now Tharangambadi, on the Coromandel Coast in southern India. The red turtle dove is now placed in the genus Streptopelia that was introduced in 1855 by the French ornithologist Charles Lucien Bonaparte. The genus name is from the Ancient Greek streptos meaning "collar" and peleia meaning "dove".

Two subspecies are recognised:

- S. t. humilis (Temminck, 1824) – eastern Nepal, northeastern India and northeastern Tibet to northern China and the Philippines
- S. t. tranquebarica (Hermann, 1804) – Pakistan, peninsular India, western Nepal

== Description ==
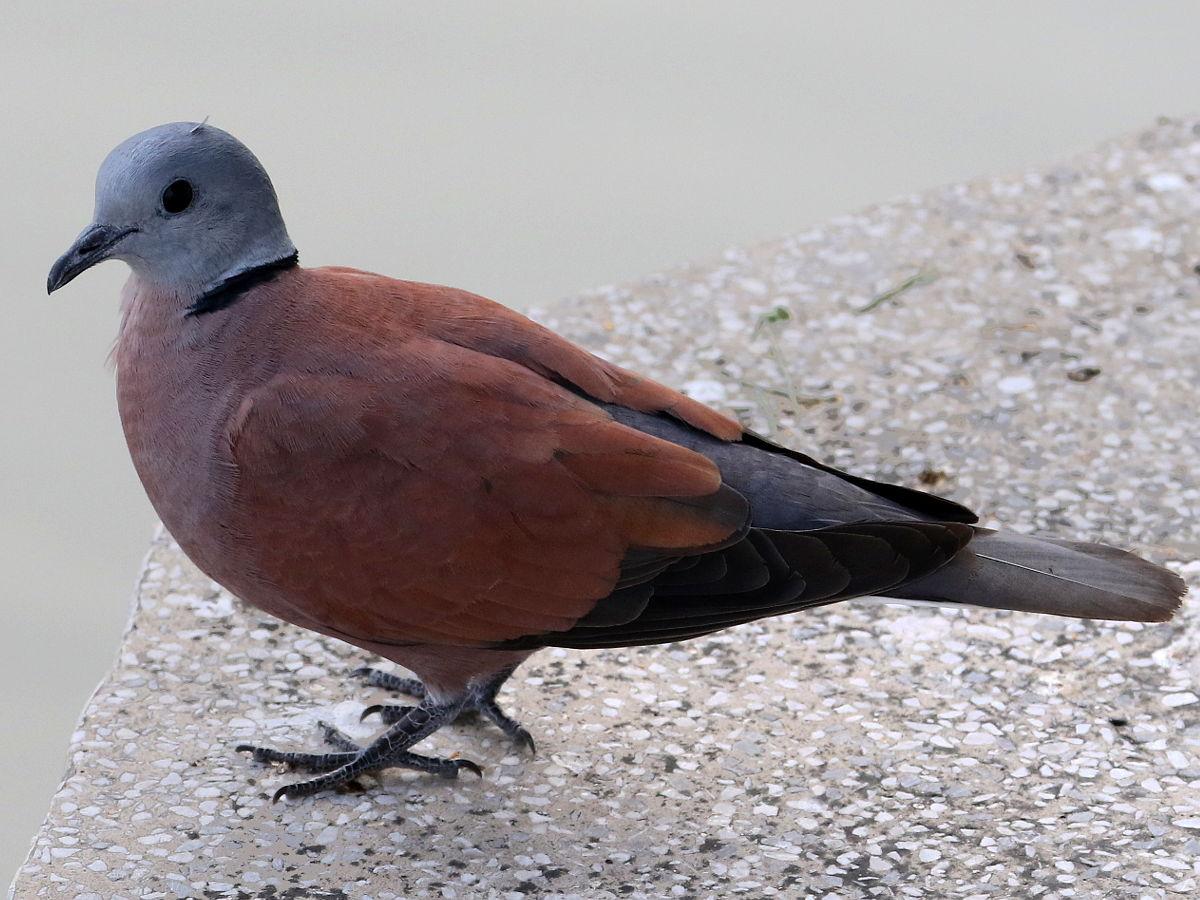
Male, Bang Pa-In Palace, Thailand

The red collared dove is a relatively small species, with a length of 20.5–23 cm (8.1–9.1 in) and a weight of around 104 g (3.7 oz). The male has a bluish head and light red-brown body with a black ring round its neck, while the female is similar but pinkish all over.

== Distribution and habitat ==
This dove is essentially a plains species, extending to Taiwan and the Philippines but uncommon on the Indonesian archipelago (avoiding rocky foothills), and an Oriental species. There is, however, a summer migration into the broader cultivated valleys of Afghania where it breeds. It is the most common dove throughout Punjab. It is a summer migrant visitor to India, where it is more or less resident. It prefers better-wooded tracts such as canal or roadside tree plantations and avoids extensive desert regions. When they first arrive they are often in small flocks, but they soon split up and start pair formation and breeding.

== Status ==
The red collared dove has an extremely large range. The population size has not been quantified, but is believed to be large. There is some evidence for a decline in the population, but the decline is slow and the species has been evaluated by the International Union for Conservation of Nature (IUCN) as of Least Concern.
