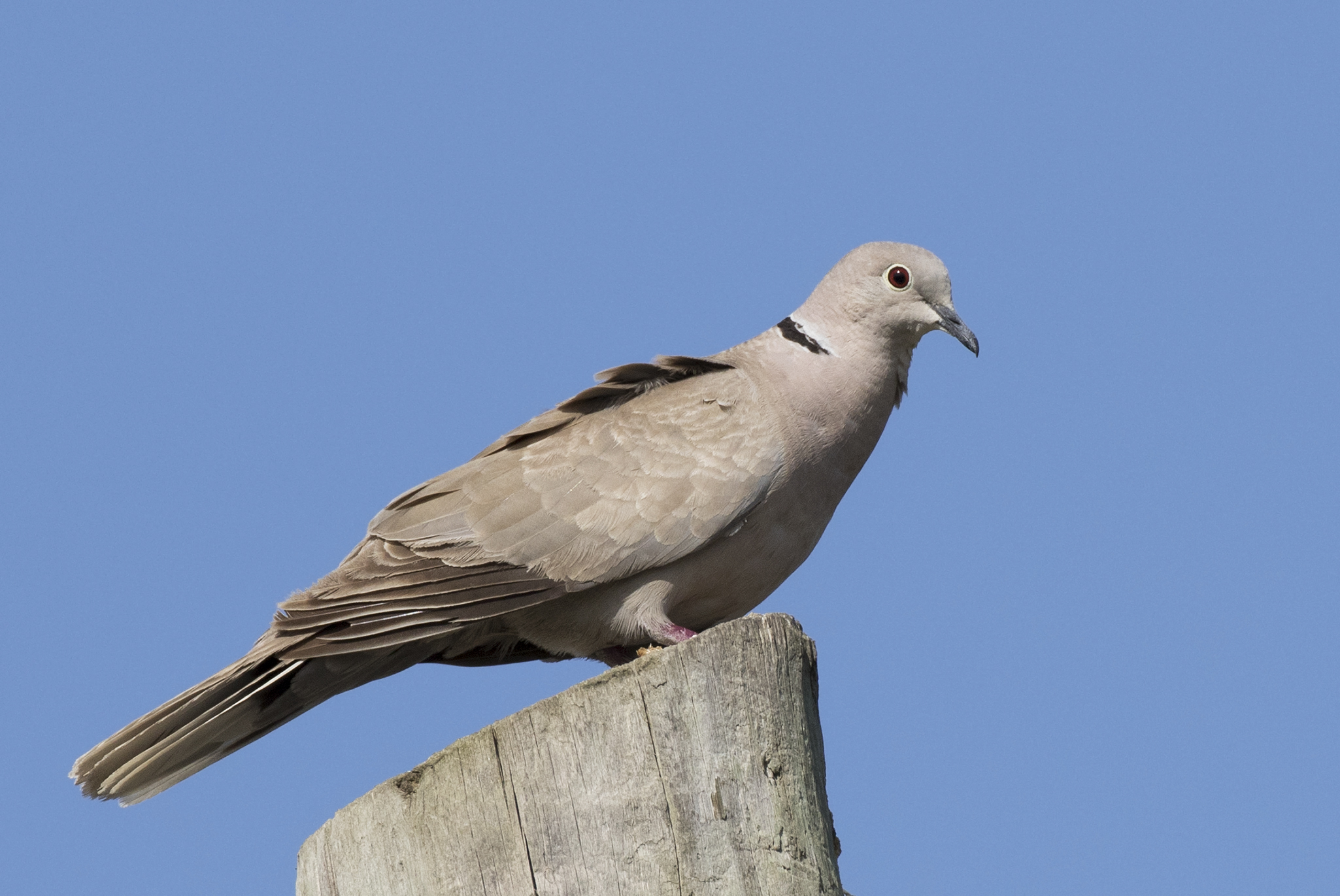
- A Eurasian collared dove (Streptopelia decaocto) in Adana, Turkey. It is a typical and widespread member of the collared doves.

Scientific classification
- Kingdom: Animalia
- Phylum: Chordata
- Class: Aves
- Order: Columbiformes
- Family: Columbidae
- Tribe: Columbini
- Genus: Streptopelia; Bonaparte, 1855

Type species
- Columba risoria Linnaeus, 1758

Species
- See text

= Streptopelia =

Genus of birds of the family Columbidae

Streptopelia (collared doves and turtle doves) is a genus of 16 species of birds in the pigeon and dove family Columbidae native to the Old World in Africa, Europe, and Asia. These are mainly slim, small to medium-sized species. The upperparts tend to be buffy brown and the underparts are often a shade of pinkish-brown, and they have a characteristic black-and-white patch on the neck. They have cooing or purring songs, monotonous in some, restful and soothing in others. The genus divides into two groups, the collared dove group (12 species) with uniform upperparts and a black half-collar edged with white, and the turtle dove group (4 species) with patterned upperparts and a barred side panel on the neck. They range in size from the 20–23 cm red collared dove to the 33–35 cm oriental turtle dove. Most of the species are resident or disperse over short distances, but two (the European and Oriental turtle doves) are long-distance migrants breeding in temperate areas and wintering in the tropics. The sexes are not differentiated in most of the species, except for the red collared dove, where the males are orange-red with a greyish head, and the females a duller brown.

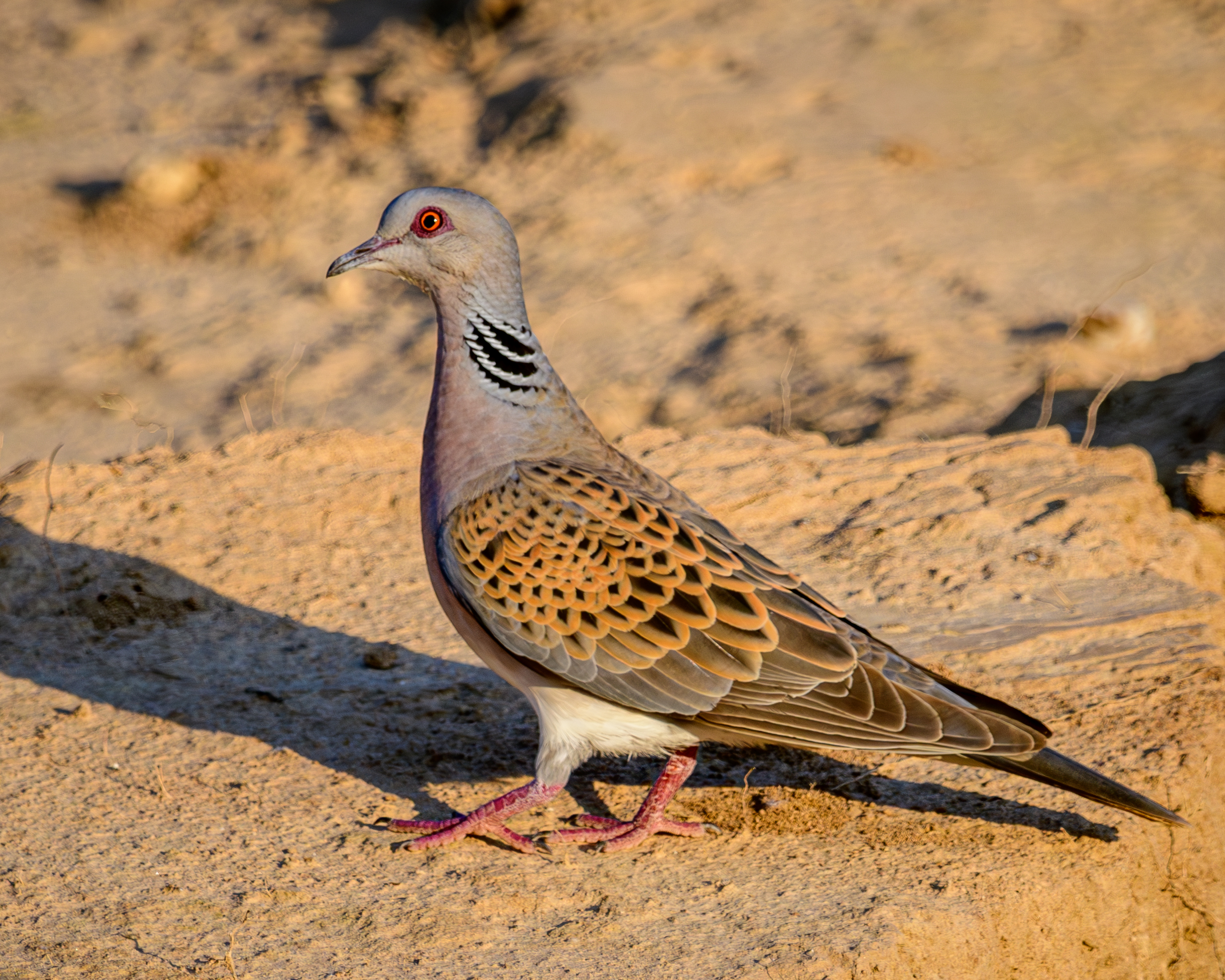
A European turtle dove Streptopelia turtur in Germany.

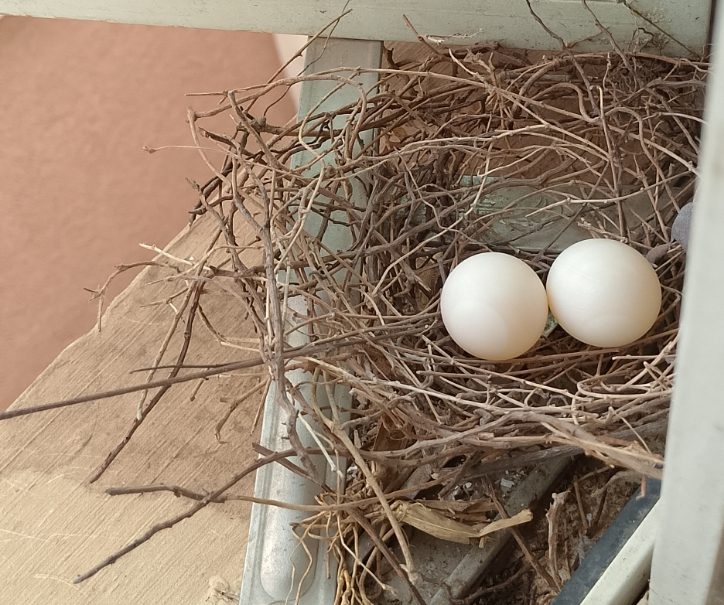
Dove eggs on a nest

As a group, this genus is highly successful; several species are abundant in a range of habitats in the tropics, with three species having a more extensive distribution into temperate areas as well. The Eurasian collared dove (Streptopelia decaocto) in particular has expanded naturally out of its original range of the warmer temperate regions from southeastern Europe to India to colonise the rest of Europe, reaching as far west as Great Britain by 1960 and Ireland soon after, and also east across northern China to Japan. It has also been introduced into the Americas where it has now colonised most of North America, Central America, and the Caribbean, and is still spreading rapidly. Some other species have been less successful in recent years, with two species listed by IUCN as Vulnerable.

== Taxonomy ==
The genus Streptopelia was described in 1855 by the French ornithologist Charles Lucien Bonaparte. The genus name comes from Ancient Greek στρεπτός (streptós), meaning "twisted, wearing a torc", and πέλεια (péleia) meaning "dove". Also in 1855, the English zoologist George Robert Gray designated the type species as Streptopelia risoria, the Barbary dove. Although Streptopelia risoria has been confirmed as a valid name by the International Commission on Zoological Nomenclature, the Barbary dove is generally treated as a domesticated form of the African collared dove Streptopelia roseogrisea.

== Species ==
Along with the Barbary dove, the genus contains 15 species:

Image	Scientific name	Common name	Distribution	IUCN status
	Streptopelia turtur	European turtle dove	Europe, North Africa, western Asia; wintering Africa south of the Sahara	VU
	Streptopelia lugens	Dusky turtle dove	Tropical East Africa	LC
	Streptopelia hypopyrrha	Adamawa turtle dove	Tropical West Africa	LC
	Streptopelia orientalis	Oriental turtle dove	Asia, widespread; wintering further south in Asia	LC
	Streptopelia bitorquata	Sunda collared dove	Java east to Timor	LC
	Streptopelia dusumieri	Philippine collared dove	Philippines, endemic	VU
	Streptopelia decaocto	Eurasian collared dove	Europe, North Africa, Asia; invasive in Americas and Japan	LC
	Streptopelia xanthocycla	Burmese collared dove	Myanmar, endemic	LC
	Streptopelia roseogrisea	African collared dove	Sahel region of Africa, southwest Arabia; invasive in Caribbean and New Zealand	LC
	Streptopelia risoria	Barbary dove	Northern Africa and Arabian Peninsula	Domesticated
	Streptopelia reichenowi	White-winged collared dove	Southern Ethiopia, southern Somalia	LC
	Streptopelia decipiens	Mourning collared dove	Tropical Africa	LC
	Streptopelia semitorquata	Red-eyed dove	Tropical and southern Africa	LC
	Streptopelia capicola	Ring-necked dove	Eastern and southern Africa	LC
	Streptopelia vinacea	Vinaceous dove	Sahel region of Africa	LC
	Streptopelia tranquebarica	Red collared dove	Southern Asia	LC

- - - - - - - - - Streptopelia decaocto
                - Streptopelia roseogrisea
              - Streptopelia decipiens
            - - Streptopelia capicola
              - Streptopelia vinacea
            - Streptopelia semitorquata
          - - - Streptopelia hypopyrrha
              - Streptopelia turtur
            - Streptopelia orientalis
          - Streptopelia bitorquata
          - Streptopelia tranquebarica
    - - Columba
      - - - Nesoenas mayeri
          - Nesoenas picturatus
        - - Spilopelia chinensis
          - Spilopelia senegalensis
  - Patagioenas

Phylogenetic position based on Johnson et al. (2001).

The genera Spilopelia and Nesoenas were formerly included in Streptopelia, but have since been separated out to make the genus monophyletic.
