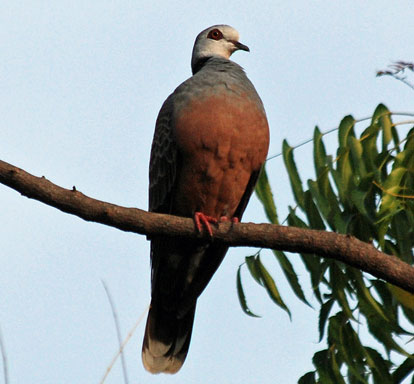
- Poli, Cameroon

Conservation status
- Least Concern (IUCN 3.1)

Scientific classification
- Kingdom: Animalia
- Phylum: Chordata
- Class: Aves
- Order: Columbiformes
- Family: Columbidae
- Genus: Streptopelia
- Species: S. hypopyrrha

Binomial name
- Streptopelia hypopyrrha (Reichenow, 1910)

= Adamawa turtle dove =

Species of bird

The Adamawa turtle dove (Streptopelia hypopyrrha) is a species of bird in the pigeon and dove family Columbidae. It is also known as the pink-bellied turtle dove. The species is closely related to and has been considered the same species as the dusky turtle dove. The species has a disjunct distribution, being native to Cameroon, Nigeria and southwestern Chad and further west in Gambia, Senegal and Mali. It has also been reported defending a territory in Togo, suggesting a population may exist there too.

The Adamawa turtle dove measures 30 to 31 cm (12–12 in) in length and weighs 147–187 g (5.2–6.6 oz). It has a silver-grey face and a blue-grey head, a distinctive dark black patch on the shoulder, with a pink belly and breast and brown upperparts edged with grey-brown. Females and juveniles are paler than the males.

The Adamawa turtle dove inhabits a range of habitats, from sea level to 1,200 m (3,900 ft), particularly forest edge, wooded ravines, gallery forest, suburban gardens and farmland. It is uncertain if the species is migratory, or possibly nomadic, as periods when the species is present in unexpected locations may simply reflect poor ornithological knowledge of the area.

Little is known about its behaviour. It feeds on the ground on seeds, sometimes in flocks of up to 60 birds in the non-breeding season, and sometimes with other dove species. Breeding occurs at the end of the dry season. Males display to females through a display flight, with energetic flapping upwards followed by a slow glide down. Both parents build the flimsy nest, and the two eggs are white.

The conservation status of the Adamawa turtle dove was assessed by BirdLife International in 2012. It is considered to be a species of least concern.
