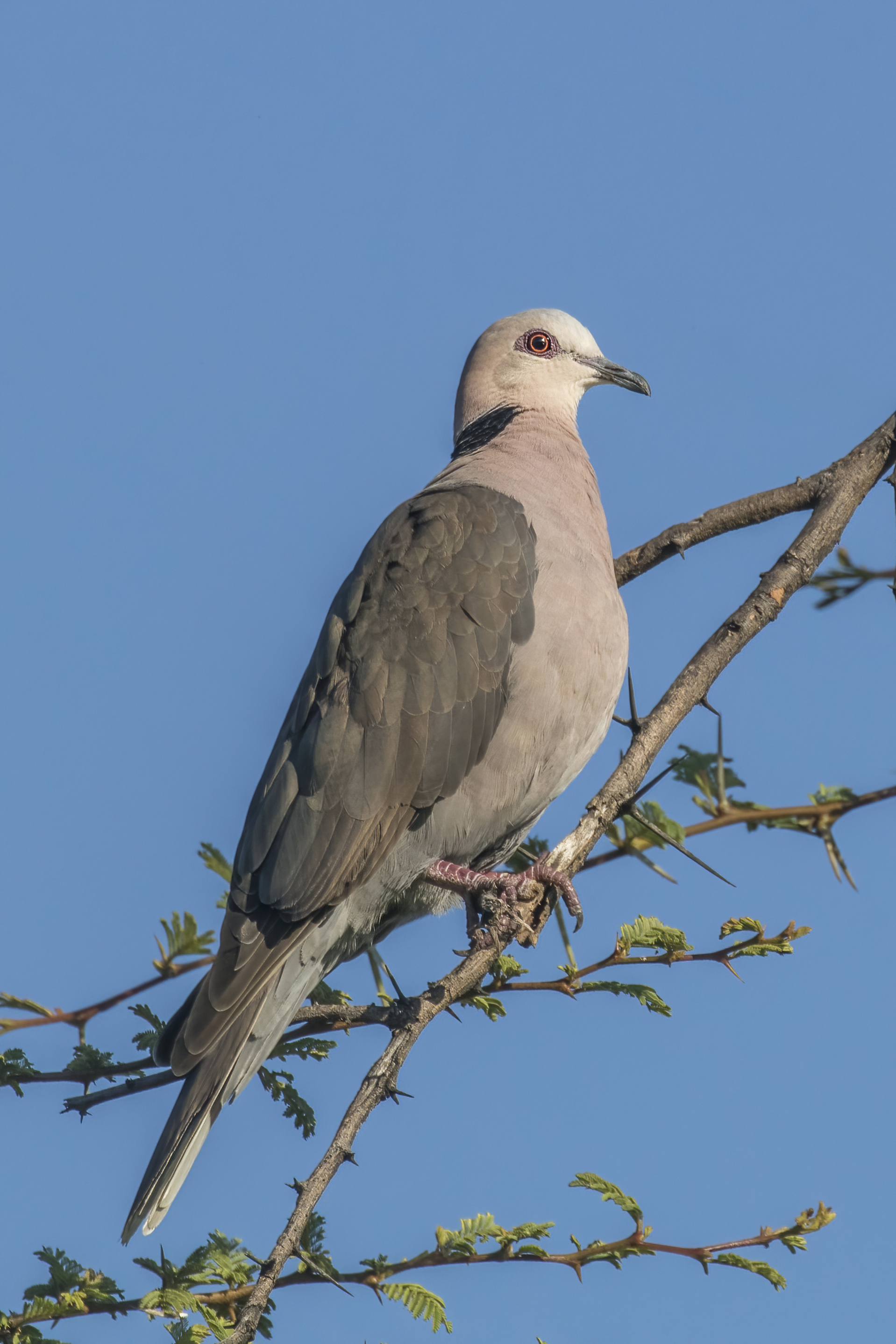
- Red-eyed dove in Zimbabwe

Conservation status
- Least Concern (IUCN 3.1)

Scientific classification
- Kingdom: Animalia
- Phylum: Chordata
- Class: Aves
- Order: Columbiformes
- Family: Columbidae
- Genus: Streptopelia
- Species: S. semitorquata

Binomial name
- Streptopelia semitorquata (Rüppell, 1837)

Audio
- Recording of the bird from South Africa

= Red-eyed dove =

Species of bird

The red-eyed dove (Streptopelia semitorquata) is a dove that is widespread and common in Sub-Saharan Africa. It has been listed as Least Concern on the IUCN Red List since 2004.

== Taxonomy ==
The red-eyed dove was formally described by the German naturalist Eduard Rüppell in 1835 from birds seen in the Taranta Mountains of Eritrea. He coined the binomial name Columba semitorquata. The specific epithet is combines the Latin semi- meaning "half-" or "small" and torquatus meaning "collared". The species is monotypic, with no subspecies being recognised.

== Description ==
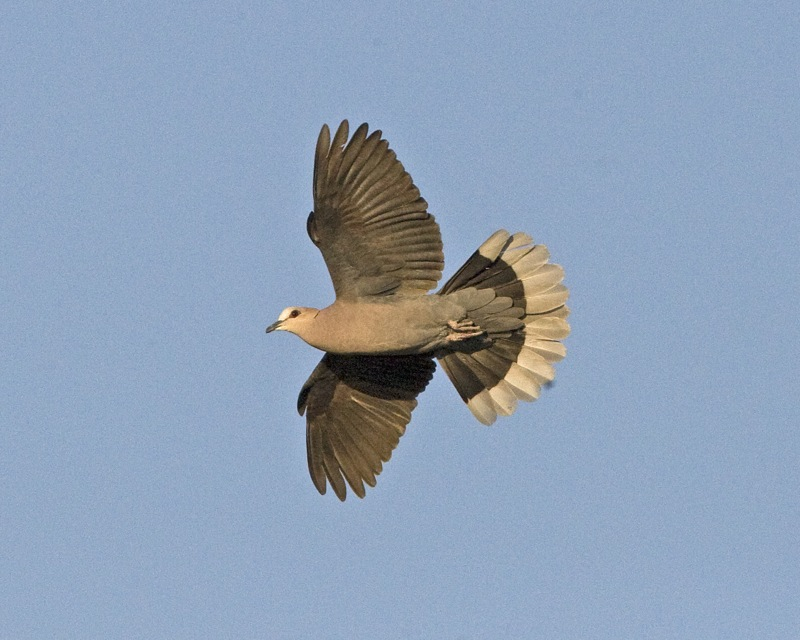
Adult in flight, Botswana

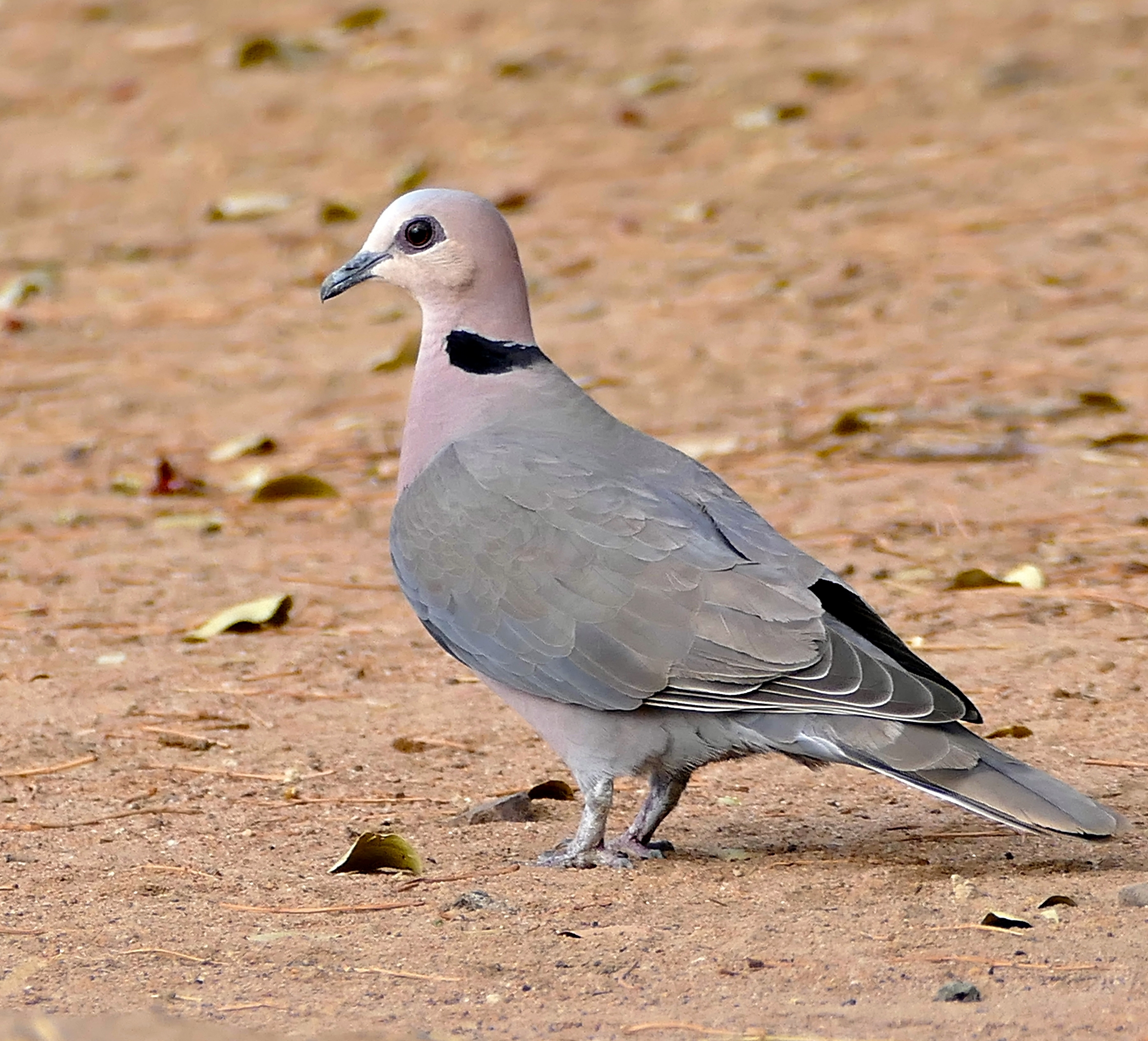
Adult in Hlane Royal National Park, Eswatini

The red-eyed dove's pale bluish grey forehead merges into a darker hue on the crown. The neck, breast, and underparts, are dark mauve-pink to wine-red, upperparts are greyish brown, and primaries are black. Outer wing-coverts are dark slaty blue. Flanks, sides of rump, and underwing-coverts are bluish-grey. Rectrices are dark grey basally, light brownish grey on the terminal half. Neck has a black half-collar. Iris varies from yellowish to orange to red or orange-brown. Orbital skin is purplish red. Bill is black. Legs are purplish red. Most of the feathers have reddish buff or reddish brown edges and indistinct dark subterminal bars. Neck collar is indistinct and restricted to the sides of neck. Legs, orbital skin, and iris are dull. Sexes are alike. Juveniles are duller and browner. It is typically 30 cm (12 in) in length and 162–310 g (5.7–10.9 oz). It is the largest of the "ringneck" species of dove. Red-eyed doves in the Ethiopian Highlands are larger than those in West Africa and coastal Kenya.

== Distribution and habitat ==
It is distributed through most of sub-Saharan Africa, except in desert zones. It is a common, if not abundant, species in most habitats other than deserts. Like several other species in this genus, they are not particularly gregarious and often feed alone or in pairs. They can be found in forests near rivers.

== Behaviour ==
Red-eyed doves build stick nests in trees, where the females lay two white eggs at a time. Its flight is quick, with the regular beats and an occasional sharp flick of the wings, which are characteristic of pigeons in general.
