= Tukmo =

Tukmol also known as Eshei is the common name of two species of wild doves in the Philippines. It can refer to:

- Spotted dove (Spilopelia chinensis), also known as the Chinese dove
- Zebra dove (Geopelia striata), also known as the barred ground dove
