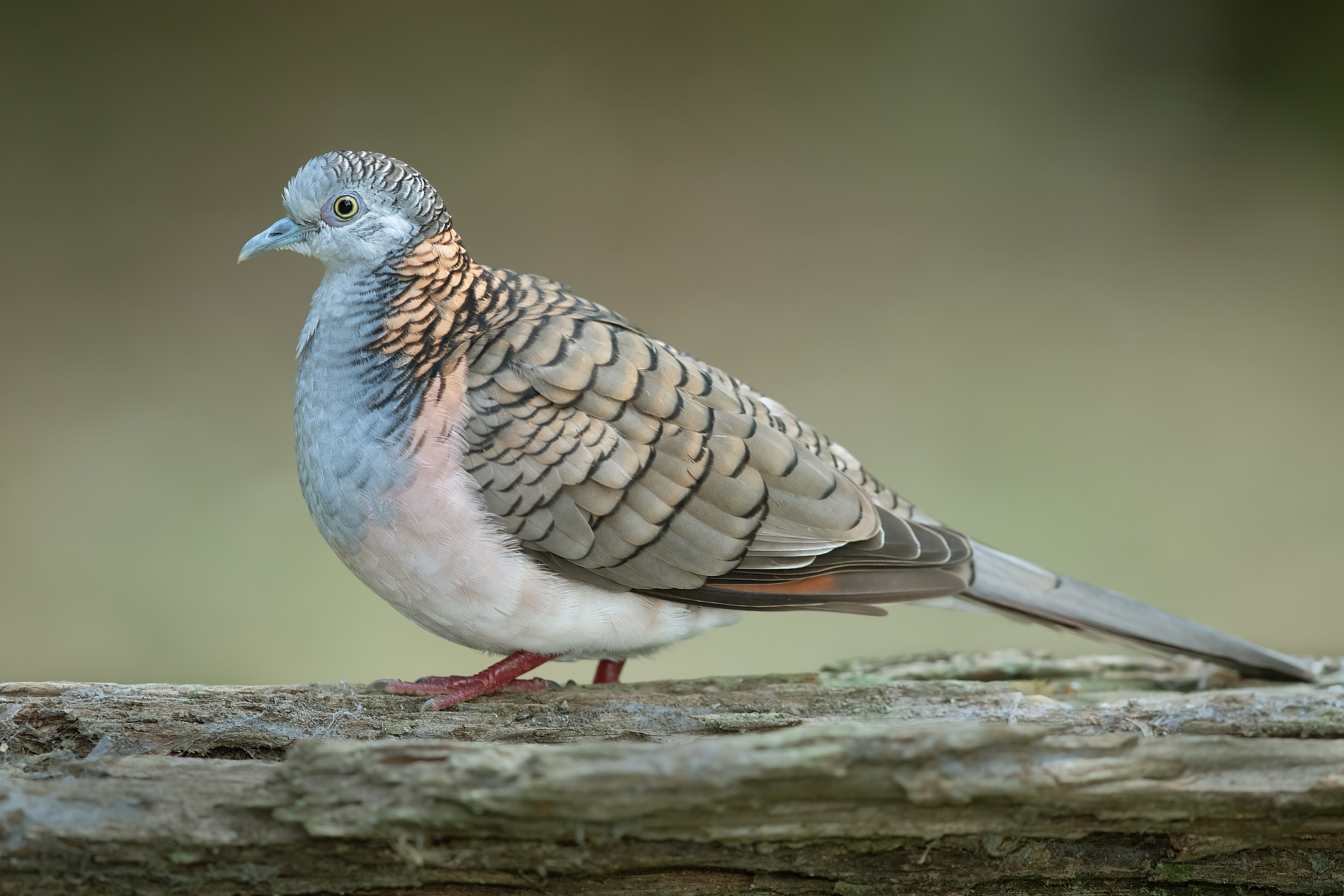

Conservation status
- Least Concern (IUCN 3.1)

Scientific classification
- Kingdom: Animalia
- Phylum: Chordata
- Class: Aves
- Order: Columbiformes
- Family: Columbidae
- Genus: Geopelia
- Species: G. humeralis

Binomial name
- Geopelia humeralis (Temminck, 1821)
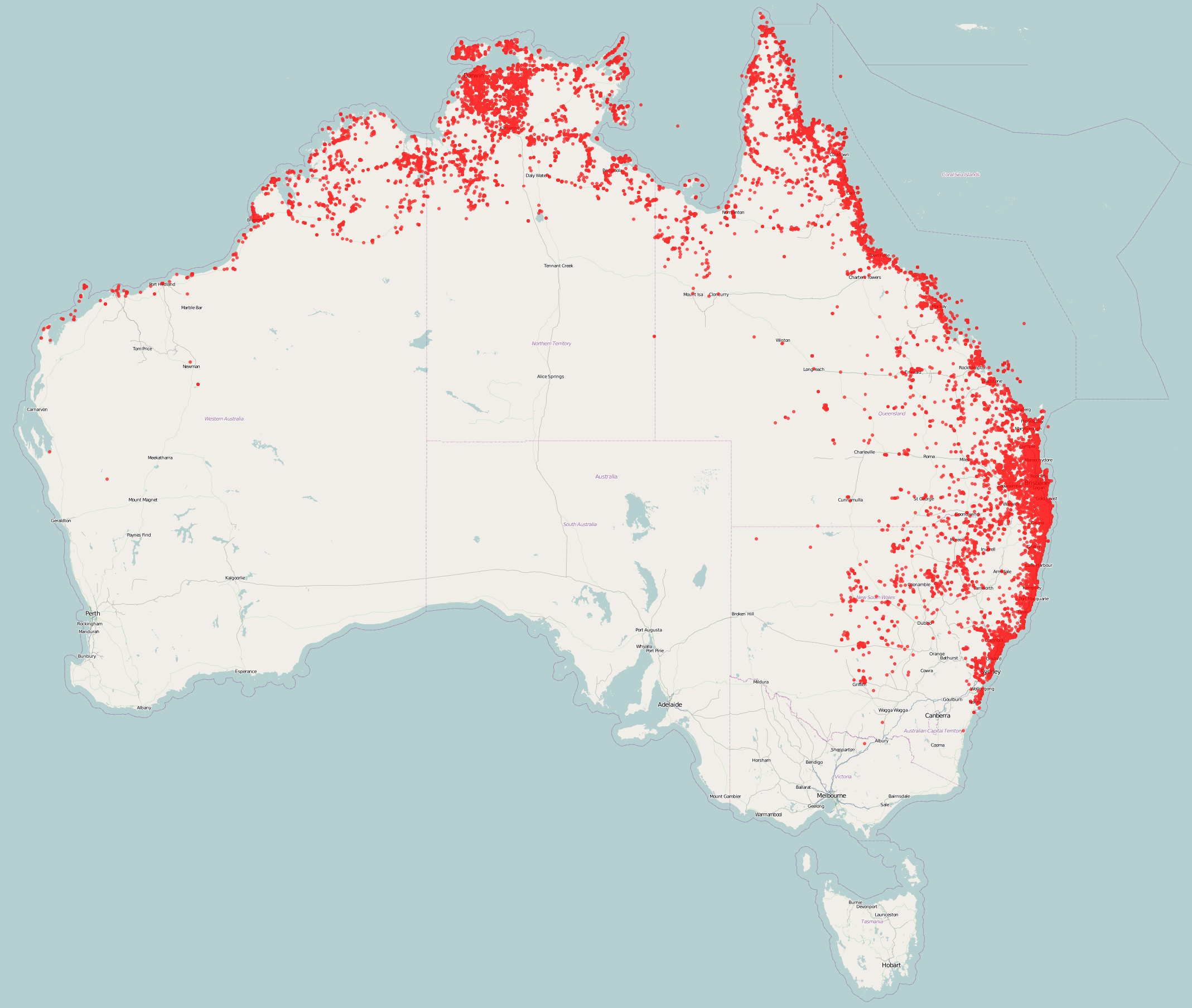
- Australian distribution

= Bar-shouldered dove =

Species of bird

The bar-shouldered dove (Geopelia humeralis) is a species of long tailed dove native to Australia and Southern New Guinea. It is protected under the National Parks and Wildlife Act 1974. It is a medium-sized pigeon varying in size from 26–30 cm (10–12 in). Its voice is a distinctive and melodious "cook-a-wook" or "coolicoo".

== Description ==
The dove has a blue-grey breast with chequered brown-bronze wings. The nape is similar to that of the peaceful dove in that the nape feathers are striated but differs in that the bar-shouldered dove does not have striated throat feathers like the peaceful dove. Furthermore, the nape feathers are copper in colour. These doves are also often confused with the introduced and common spotted turtle dove. The eye ring tends to be grey but red-brown when breeding. The juveniles are duller in colour.

Doves are often found in pairs, groups or large loose flocks and are seen commonly feeding on the ground feeding on seeds. Flight is direct and swift and wings whistle while the birds are in flight.

== Habitat ==
Bar-shouldered doves are usually found in thick vegetation where water is present, damp gullies, forests and gorges, mangroves, plantations, swamps, eucalyptus woodlands, tropical and sub-tropical scrubs and river margins. They can be found in both inland and coastal regions. The bar-shouldered dove is found throughout the east coast from southern New South Wales (with increasing numbers in the Blue Mountains and Illawarra regions), north to Cape York Peninsula and west to the Pilbara region (about Onslow, Western Australia). They have been observed with increasing frequency in southern Australia (specifically north-western Victoria) but may have been displaced in other natural locations by introduced species. They have also been observed in the Torres Strait and are also found in other countries of the South Pacific region, such as Papua New Guinea.

== Breeding ==
Breeding season is from September to January in the south and February to April in the north. Its nest is a flat twig and grass platform usually in trees and shrubs, mangrove or scrub. The dove will lay two, white, glossy and rounded eggs.

== Parasites ==
A bar-shouldered dove was found to be infected by Toxoplasma gondii, the agent of toxoplasmosis, in a French zoo.
