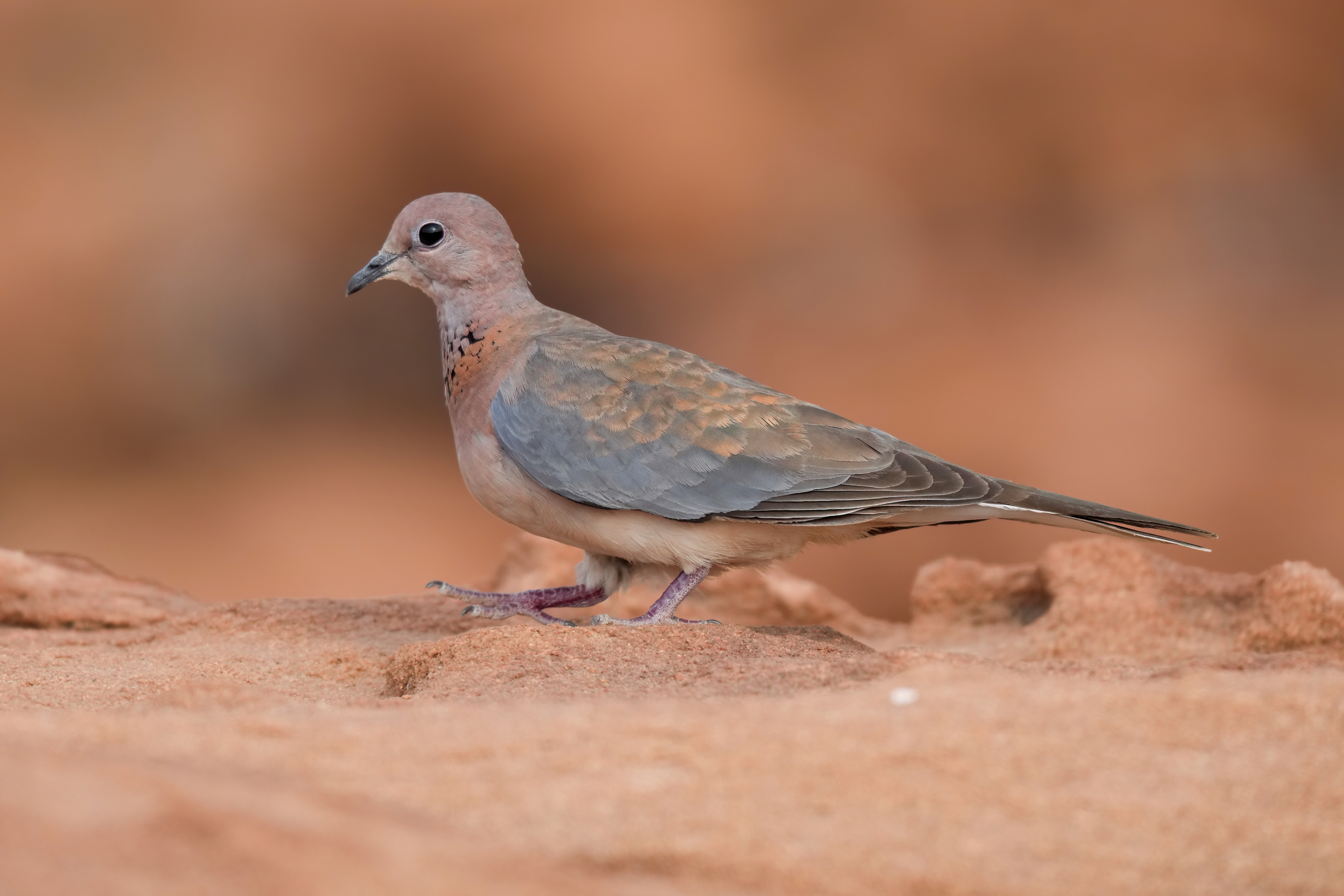
- At Etosha National Park, Namibia

Conservation status
- Least Concern (IUCN 3.1)

Scientific classification
- Kingdom: Animalia
- Phylum: Chordata
- Class: Aves
- Order: Columbiformes
- Family: Columbidae
- Genus: Spilopelia
- Species: S. senegalensis

Binomial name
- Spilopelia senegalensis (Linnaeus, 1766)

Synonyms
- Columba senegalensis Linnaeus, 1766; Streptopelia senegalensis (Linnaeus, 1766); Stigmatopelia senegalensis (Linnaeus, 1766)

Audio
- Call of S. s. cambayensis

= Laughing dove =

Species of bird

The laughing dove (Spilopelia senegalensis) is a small pigeon that is a resident breeder in Africa, the Middle East, South Asia, and Western Australia where it has established itself in the wild after being released from Perth Zoo in 1898. This small long-tailed dove is found in dry scrub and semi-desert habitats where pairs can often be seen feeding on the ground. It is closely related to the spotted dove (Spilopelia chinensis) which is distinguished by a white and black chequered necklace. Other names include laughing turtle dove, palm dove and Senegal dove while in Asia the name little brown dove is often used.

== Taxonomy ==
In 1760 the French zoologist Mathurin Jacques Brisson included a description of the laughing dove in his six volume Ornithologie based on a specimen collected in Senegal. He used the French name La tourterelle à gorge tachetée du Sénégal and the Latin Tutur gutture maculato senegalensis. Although Brisson coined Latin names, these do not conform to the binomial system and are not recognised by the International Commission on Zoological Nomenclature. When in 1766 the Swedish naturalist Carl Linnaeus updated his Systema Naturae for the twelfth edition, he added 240 species that had been previously described by Brisson. One of these was the laughing dove which he placed with all the other pigeons in the genus Columba. Linnaeus included a brief description, coined the binomial name Columba senegalensis and cited Brisson's work.

For many years the laughing dove was placed in the genus Streptopelia. A molecular phylogenetic study published in 2001 found this genus was paraphyletic with respect to Columba. To create monophyletic genera the laughing dove as well as the closely related spotted dove were moved to the resurrected genus Spilopelia that had been introduced by the Swedish zoologist Carl Sundevall in 1873.

Five populations with small plumage and size differences have been given the status of subspecies:

- S. s. phoenicophila (Hartert, 1916) – Morocco to northwest Libya
- S. s. aegyptiaca (Latham, 1790) – Nile Valley (Egypt)
- S. s. senegalensis (Linnaeus, 1766) – southern laughing dove, west Arabia, Socotra Island, Africa south of the Sahara
- S. s. cambayensis (Gmelin, JF, 1789) – east Arabia and east Iran to Pakistan, India and Bangladesh
- S. s. ermanni (Bonaparte, 1856) – Kazakhstan, north Afghanistan, west China

Several other subspecies have been described but are not now generally recognised. These include S. s. sokotrae on Socotra Island, S. s. dakhlae in the Dakhla Oasis, Egypt and S. s. thome on São Tomé Island.

== Description ==
The laughing dove is a long-tailed, slim pigeon, typically 25 cm (9.8 in) in length. It is pinkish brown on the underside with a lilac tinged head and neck. The head and underparts are pinkish, shading to buff on the lower abdomen. A chequered rufous and grey patch is found on the sides of the neck of adults and is made up of split feathers. The upper parts are brownish with a bluish-grey band along the wing. The back is uniform and dull brown in the South Asian population. The African populations S. s. senegalensis and S. s. phoenicophila have a bluish grey rump and upper tail coverts but differ in the shades of the neck and wing feathers while S. s. aegyptiaca is larger and the head and nape are vinous and upper wing coverts are rufous. The tail is graduated and the outer feathers are tipped in white. The sexes are indistinguishable in the field. Young birds lack the chequered neck markings. The legs are red. The populations vary slightly in plumage with those from more arid zones being paler. Abnormal leucistic plumages have been noted.

The chuckling call is a low rolling croo-doo-doo-doo-doo with a rising and falling amplitude. Its call has been described as more musical. than the call of most doves, demonstrating an effervescent quality, which differs from the classic cooing made by other kinds of doves.

== Distribution and habitat ==
It is a common and widespread species in scrub, dry farmland, and in areas of human habitation, often becoming very tame. Its range includes much of Sub-Saharan Africa, Saudi Arabia, Iran, Kyrgyzstan, Kazakhstan, Iraq, Afghanistan, Pakistan, and India. It is also found in Cyprus, Greece, Palestine, Israel, Lebanon, Syria, Jordan, the UAE, and Turkey (these populations may be derived from human introductions). They are mostly sedentary but some populations may make movements. Birds ringed in Gujarat have been recovered 200 km north in Pakistan and exhausted birds have been recorded landing on ships in the Arabian Sea. The species (thought to belong to the nominate population) was introduced to Perth in 1889 and has become established around Western Australia. Birds that land on ships may be introduced to new regions.

== Behaviour and ecology ==
The species is usually seen in pairs or small parties and only rarely in larger groups. Larger groups are formed especially when drinking at waterholes in arid regions. Small numbers assemble on trees near waterholes before flying to the water's edge where they are able to suck up water like other members of the pigeon family. Laughing doves eat the fallen seeds, mainly of grasses, other vegetable matter and small ground insects such as termites and beetles. They are fairly terrestrial, foraging on the ground in grasslands and cultivation. Their flight is quick and direct with the regular beats and an occasional sharp flick of the wings characteristic of pigeons in general.

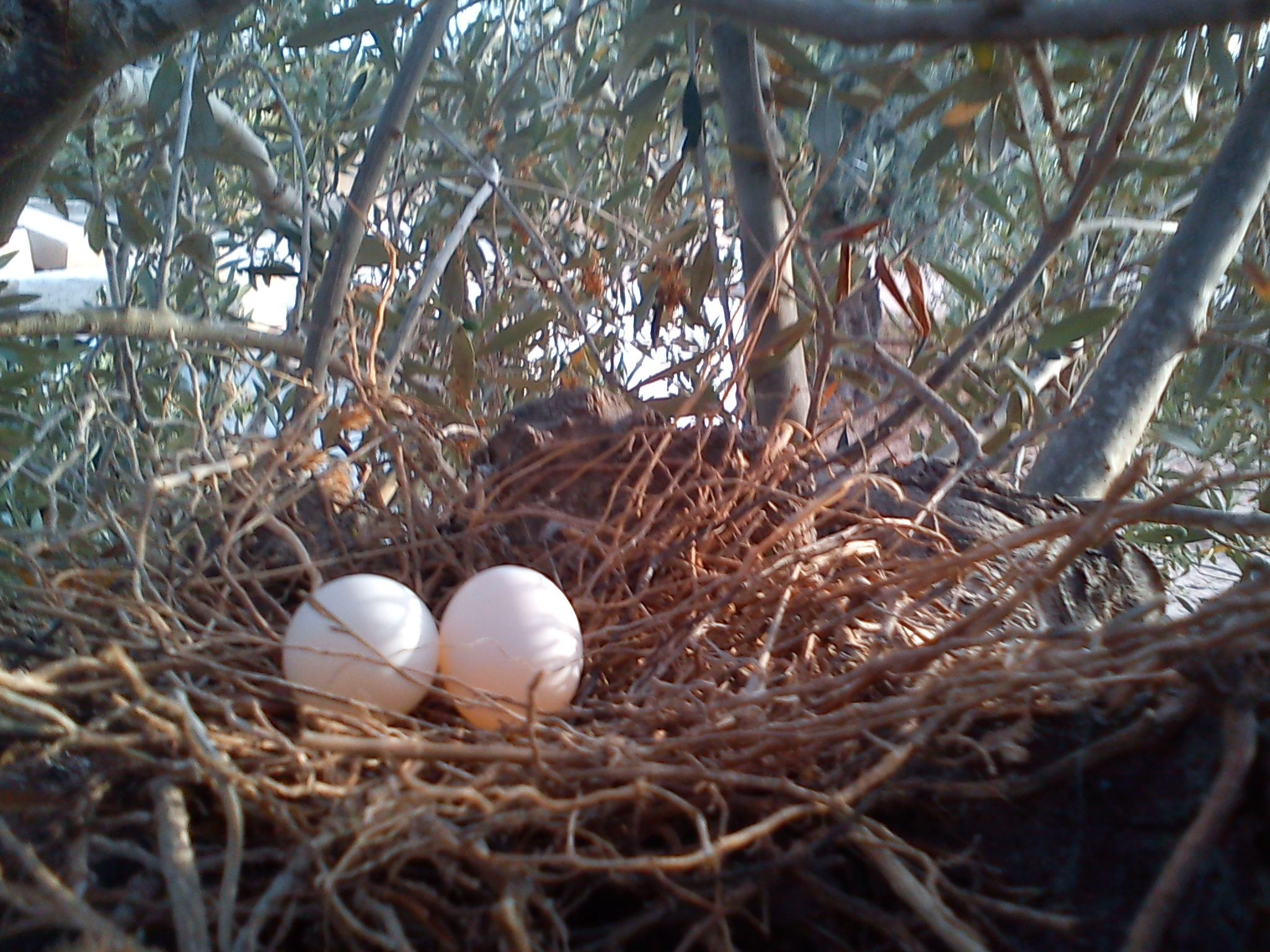
Nest on an olive tree with a typical clutch of two eggs, Djerba island

The male in courtship display follows the female with head bobbing displays while cooing. The male pecks its folded wings in "displacement-preening" to solicit copulation from the female. A female accepts by crouching and begging for food. The male may indulge in courtship feeding before mounting and copulating. Pairs may preen each other. Males may also launch into the air with wing clapping above their backs and then glide down in a gentle arc when displaying. The species has a spread out breeding season in Africa. Almost year-round in Malawi and Turkey; and mainly May to November in Zimbabwe, February to June in Egypt and Tunisia. In Australia the main breeding season is September to November. The nest is a very flimsy platform of twigs built in a low bush and sometimes in crevices or under the eaves of houses. Both parents build the nest with males bringing the twigs which are then placed by the female. Two eggs are laid within an interval of a day between them and both parents take part in building the nest, incubating and feeding the young. Males spend more time incubating the nest during the day. The eggs are incubated after the second egg is laid and the eggs hatch after about 13 to 15 days. Nesting adults may feign injury to distract and draw predators away from the nest. Multiple broods may be raised by the same pair in the same nest. Seven broods by the same pair have been noted in Turkey. Initially the altricial hatchlings are fed with regurgitated crop-milk, a secretion from the lining of the crop of parent birds. The young fledge and leave the nest after about 14 to 16 days. The Jacobin cuckoo sometimes lays its egg in the nests of the laughing dove in Africa.

Feral populations in Australia are sometimes infected by a virus that causes symptoms similar to that produced in parrots by psittacine beak and feather disease. Several ectoparasitic bird lice have been found on the species and include those in the genera Coloceras, Columbicola, Bonomiella and Hohorstiella. A blood parasite Trypanosoma hannae has been recorded in the species. Southern grey shrike have been observed preying on an adult laughing dove in northwestern India while the lizard buzzard is a predator of the species in Africa. South African birds sometimes show a beak deformity in which the upper mandible overgrowth occurs.

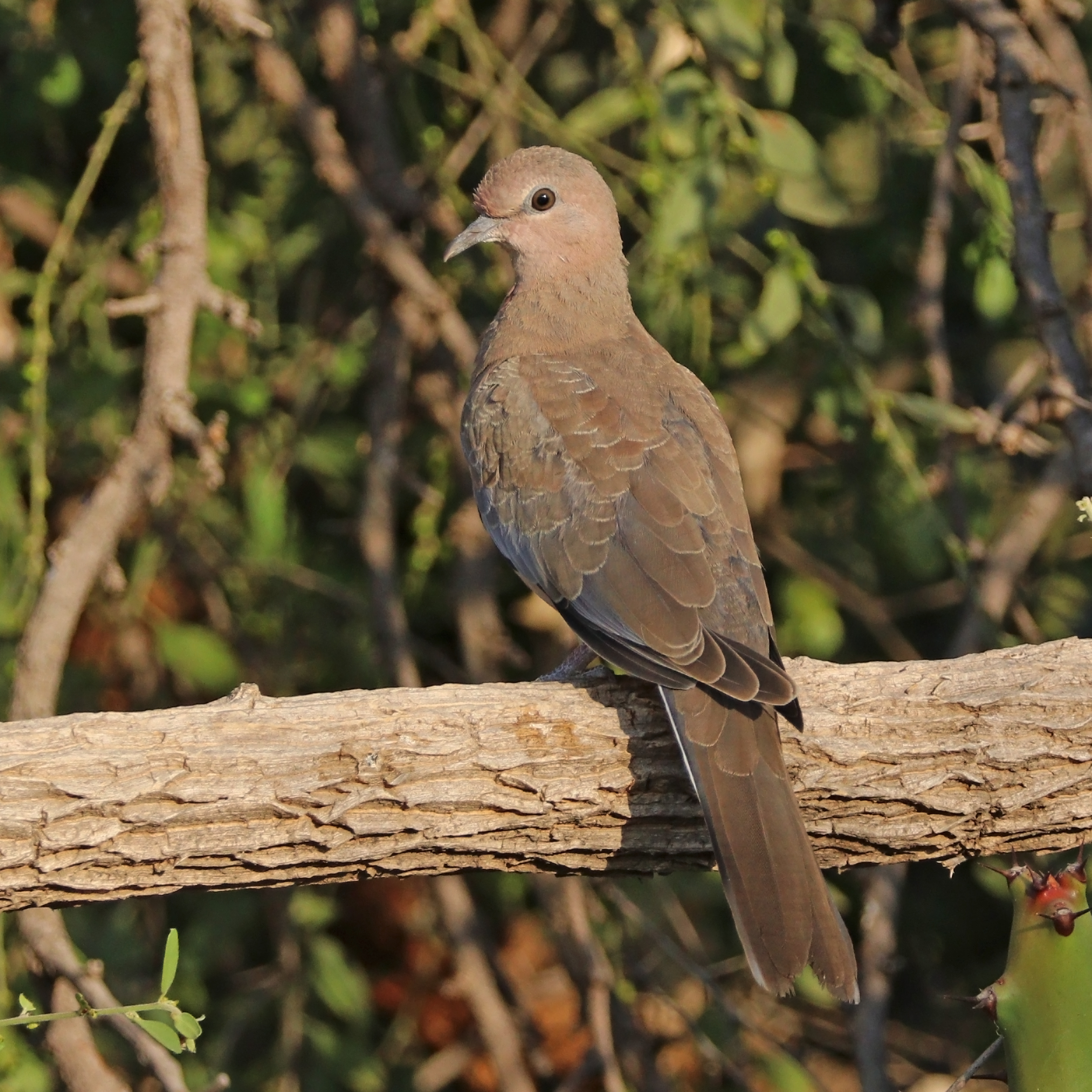
S. s cambayensis in Rajasthan, India

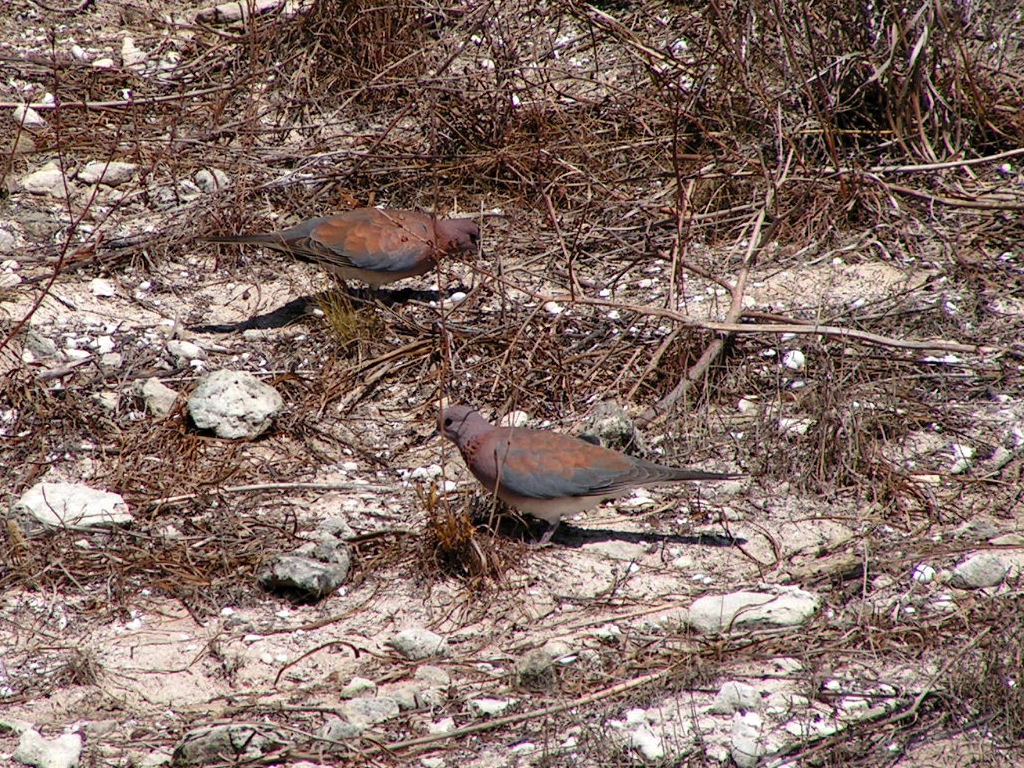
Feral S. s. senegalensis, Rottnest Island, Western Australia

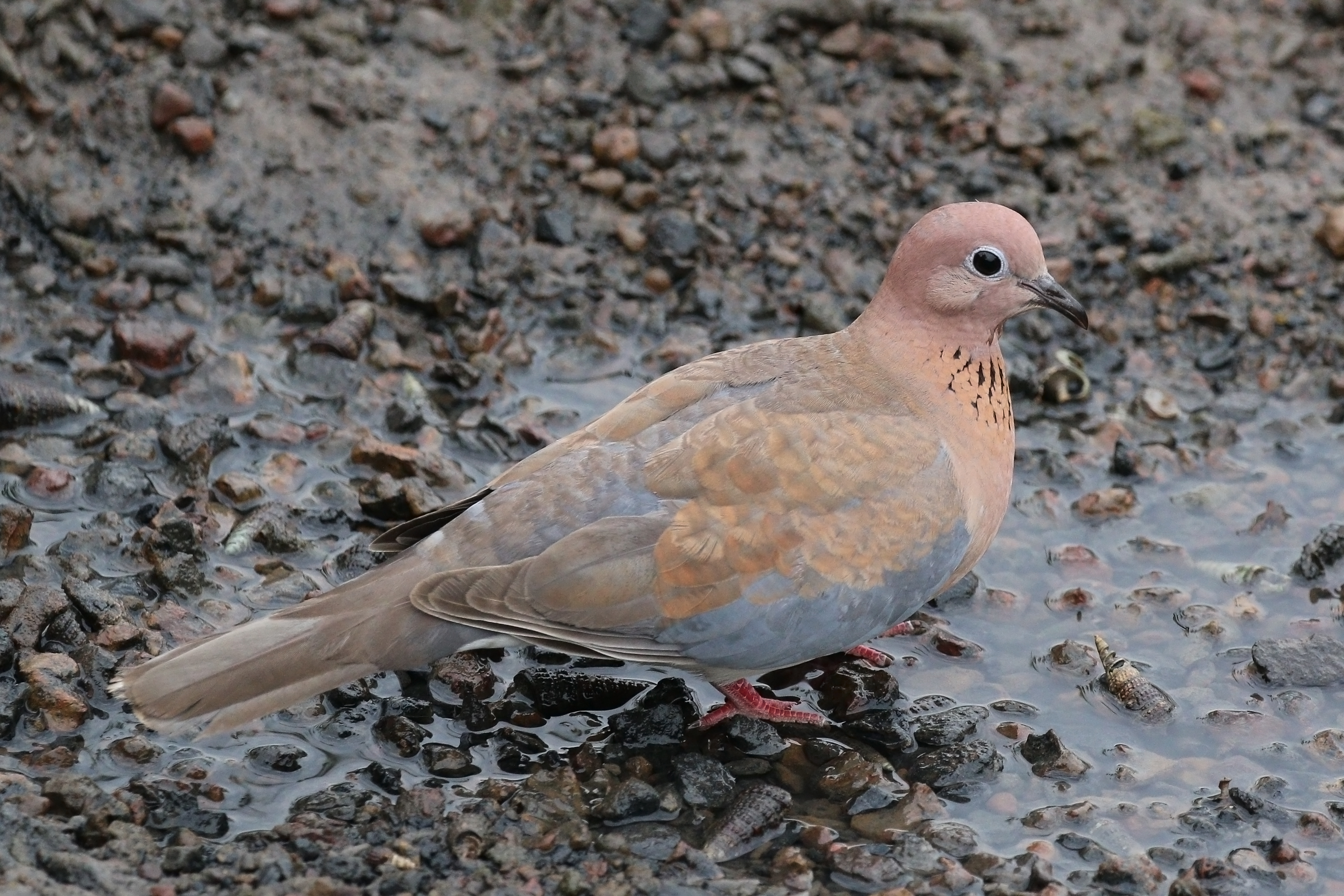
Female S. s. senegalensis, Gambia

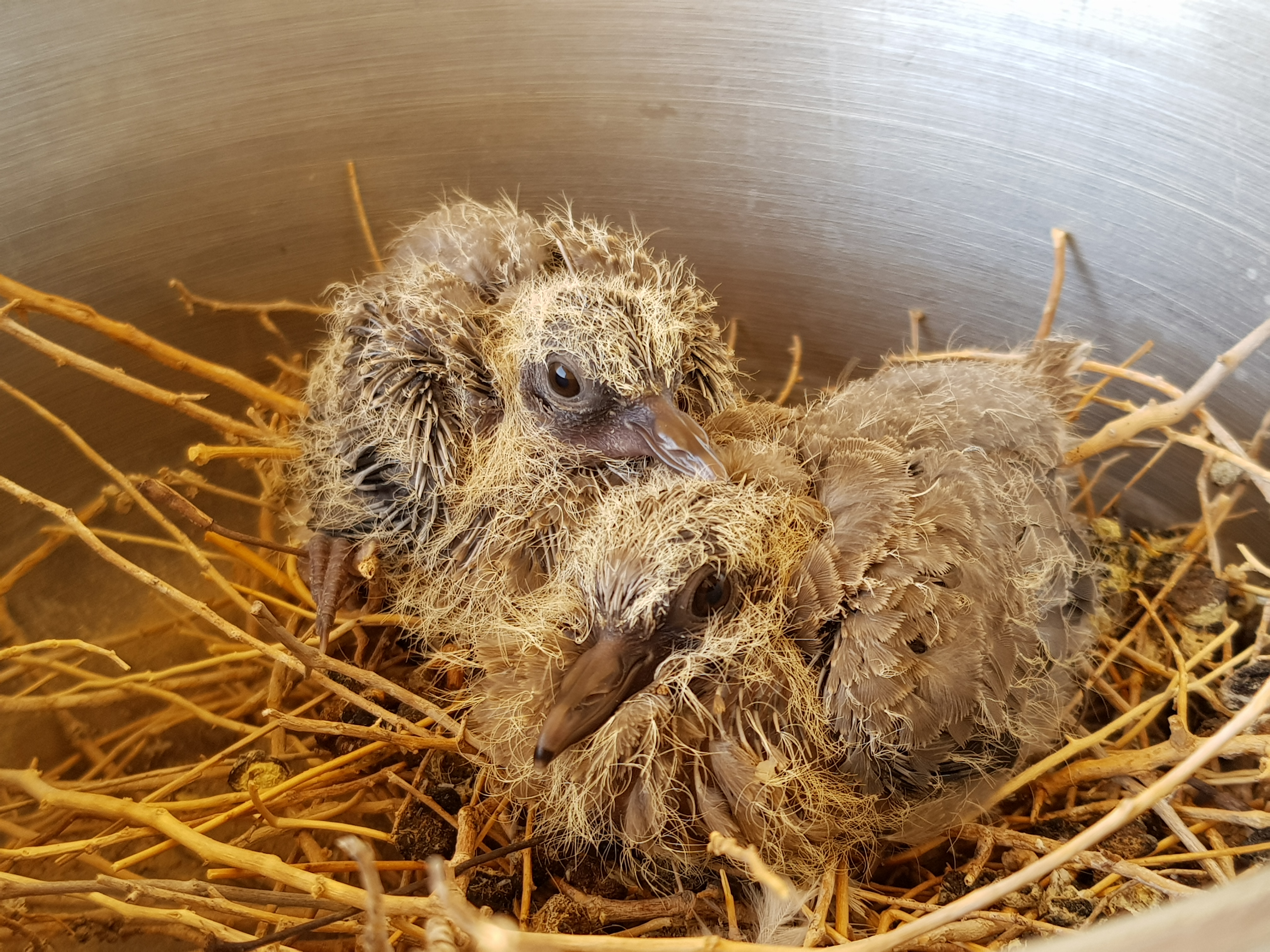
Squabs of S. senegalensis, Dubai, U.A.E.
