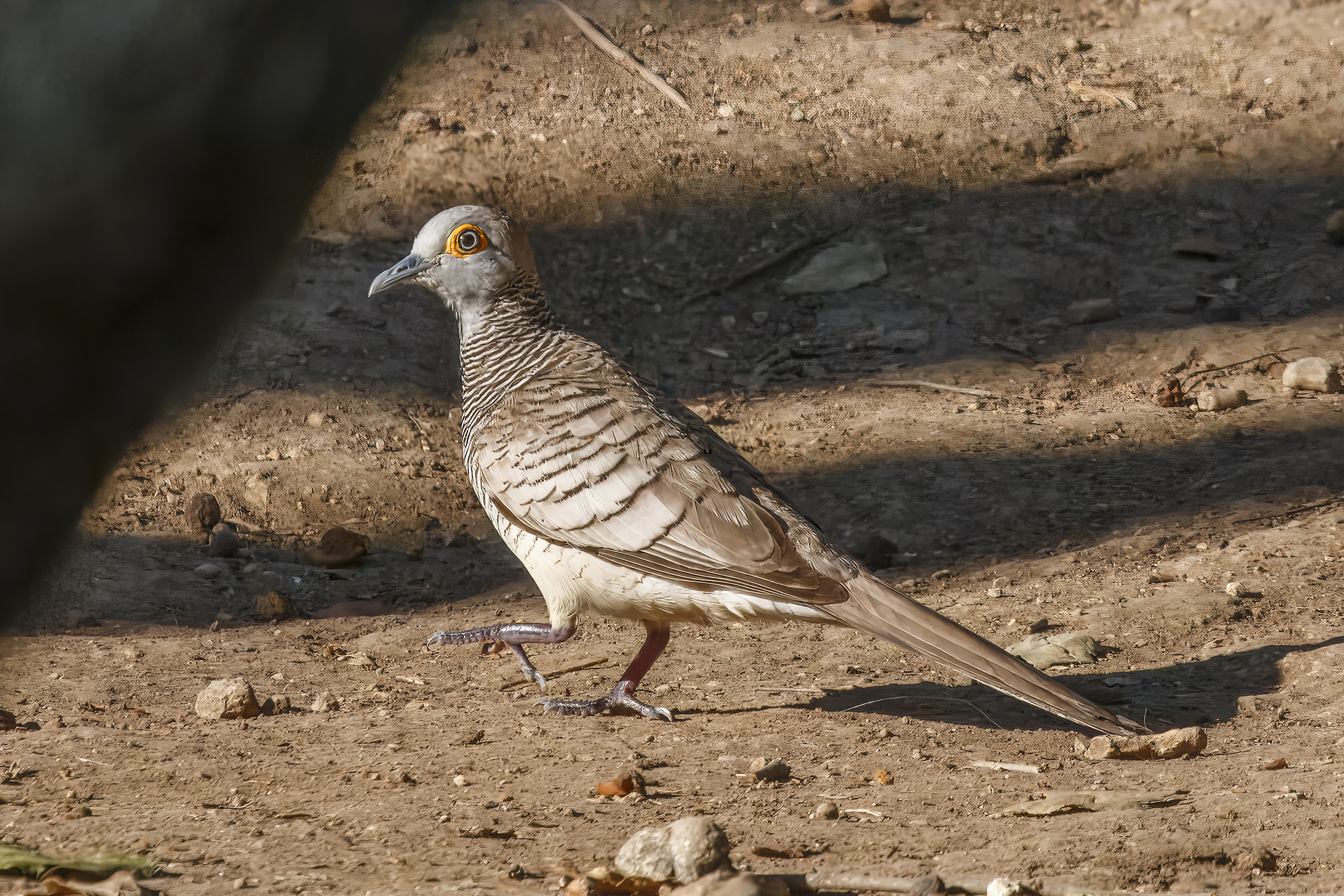
- on Rinca, Indonesia

Conservation status
- Least Concern (IUCN 3.1)

Scientific classification
- Kingdom: Animalia
- Phylum: Chordata
- Class: Aves
- Order: Columbiformes
- Family: Columbidae
- Genus: Geopelia
- Species: G. maugeus

Binomial name
- Geopelia maugeus (Temminck, 1809)

Synonyms
- Geopelia maugei

= Barred dove =

Species of dove from Indonesia

The barred dove (Geopelia maugeus), also known as temminck's zebra dove or the lesser sunda dove, is a small dove that is native and endemic to the Lesser Sunda Islands in Indonesia and Timor-Leste. It is closely related to the zebra dove of Southeast Asia and the peaceful dove of Australia and New Guinea.

== Description ==
The bird is a relatively small pigeon and varies in length from 23 to 25 centimeters (9.1 to 10.2 inches). It is generally greyish with a black-barred pattern over most of its underparts and the breast. Its orbital skin is yellowish.

== Distribution and habitat ==
It inhabits scrubs, cultivated lands, and woodland edges in lowland areas. The barred dove is found on Sumbawa, Flores, Sumba, Wetar, Alor, Timor, the Tanimbar Islands, the Kei Islands, and other small islands. It lives at elevations between 0 - 1400 meters above sea level. They are found in dry, open habitat with some shrub cover or along the edge of dry woodland areas.

== Similar Species ==
It is sometimes confused with the zebra dove, which is found in Sumbawa, but can be distinguished by its yellow orbital skin and more extensive black-and-white barring across the breast and belly
