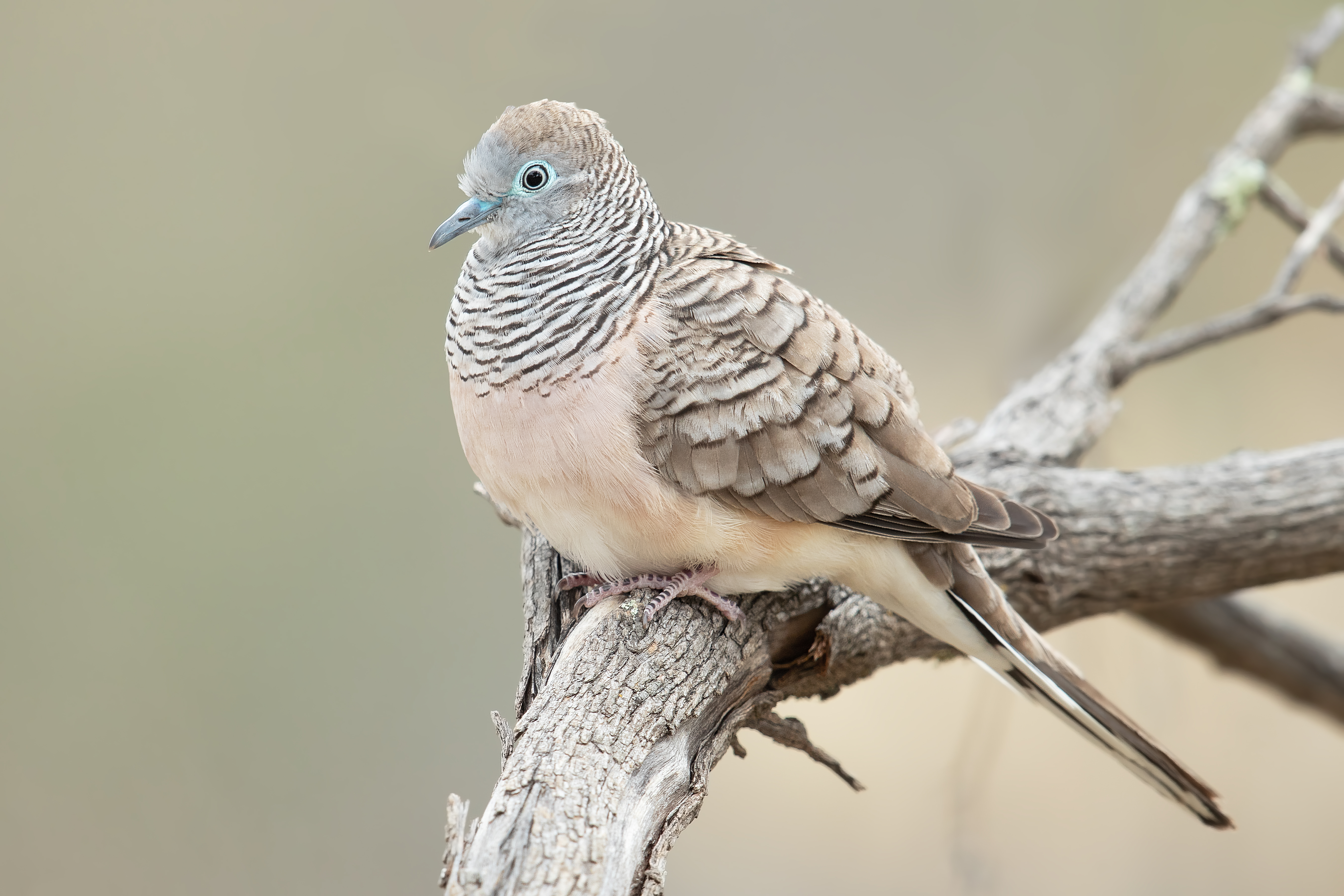

Conservation status
- Least Concern (IUCN 3.1)

Scientific classification
- Kingdom: Animalia
- Phylum: Chordata
- Class: Aves
- Order: Columbiformes
- Family: Columbidae
- Genus: Geopelia
- Species: G. placida

Binomial name
- Geopelia placida Gould, 1844

= Peaceful dove =

Species of bird

The peaceful dove (Geopelia placida) is a pigeon native to Australia and New Guinea. The peaceful dove is closely related to the zebra dove of south-east Asia and the barred dove of eastern Indonesia. Until recently, the three were classed as a single species, Geopelia striata, known as peaceful dove or zebra dove.

== Description ==
The bird is a relatively small pigeon and varies in length from 19 to 21 centimetres (7.6 to 8.4 inches). The peaceful dove has a pink-grey breast with chequered grey-brown wings. Thin striations of black appear around the neck and nape area and descend down the back. The eye is greyish-white and a blue-grey ring surrounds the eye that tapers off and joins the beak/cere. The juveniles are paler and less striated. They also have a duller eye ring. The nape is similar to that of the bar-shouldered dove in that the nape feathers are striated but differs in that the bar-shouldered dove does not have striated throat feathers like the peaceful dove. Furthermore, the nape feathers are grey-brown in colour compared to the vivid copper colour seen with bar-shouldered doves.

Calls of the peaceful dove are high-pitched "doodle-doo", "co-co-coo" and "croorrr!".

== Behaviour ==
The peaceful dove is found in pairs, groups and flocks. They feed off the ground and are found commonly in streets and gardens. They also are found in scrublands, woodlands, watercourses, railyards and on the edge of rainforests. When not found on the ground feeding, they can be found in trees roosting.

The doves fly in a rapid, undulating motion. The wings make a flushing "frrr" noise when the birds are in flight.

== Nesting ==
Breeding occurs from October to January in southern Australia and from March to June in northern Australia. Nests are built on horizontal branches of trees. Two white eggs are laid. The doves are very aggressive to other birds when breeding.

== Distribution ==
They can be found all over Australia except Tasmania, southern Victoria and south western Australia. Unfortunately, the doves' range is reducing due to competition with the introduced spotted turtle dove. In Papua they are mainly found in the south of the island but also occur at a few sites in the north and on the Aru Islands.

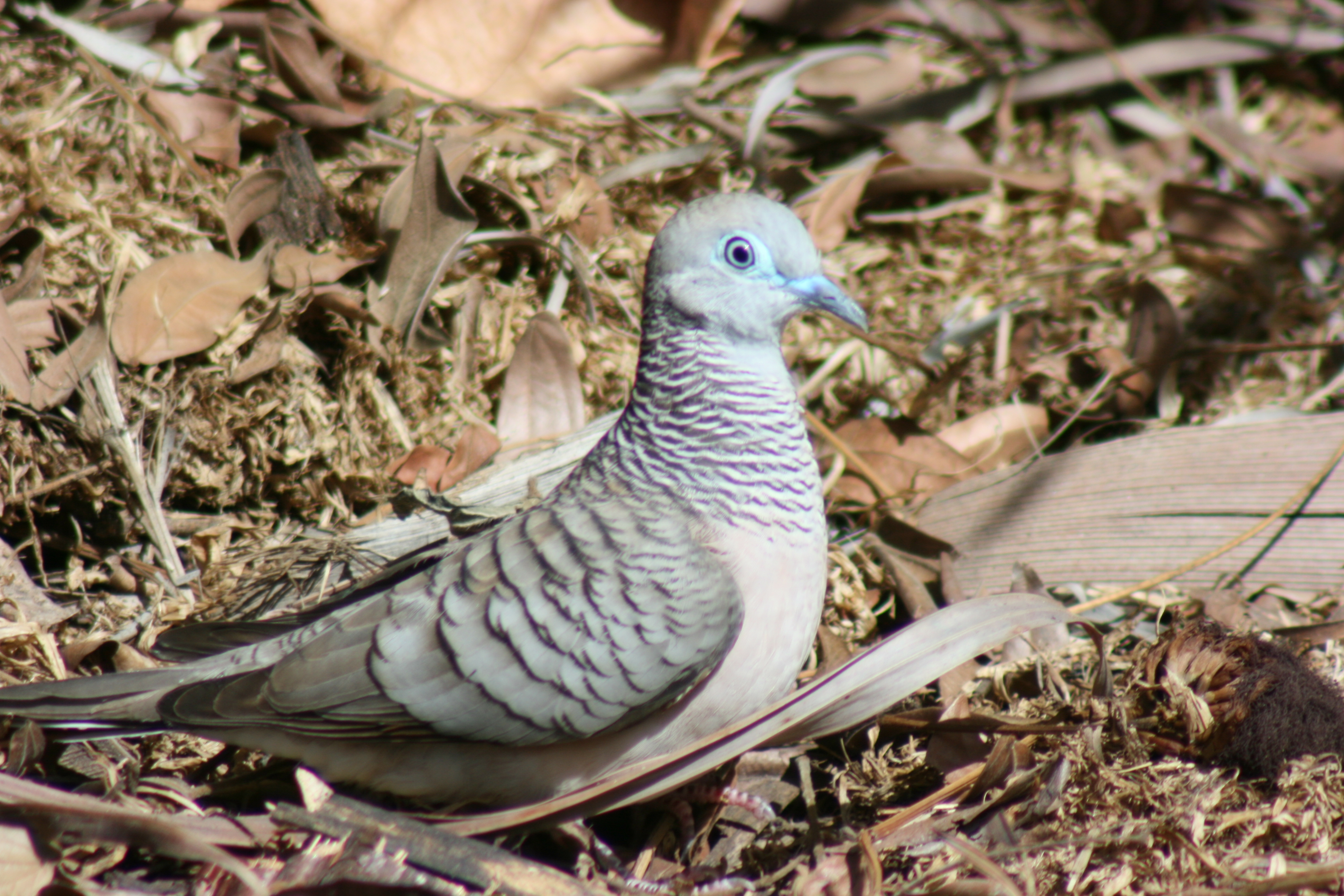
In Cairns, Australia
