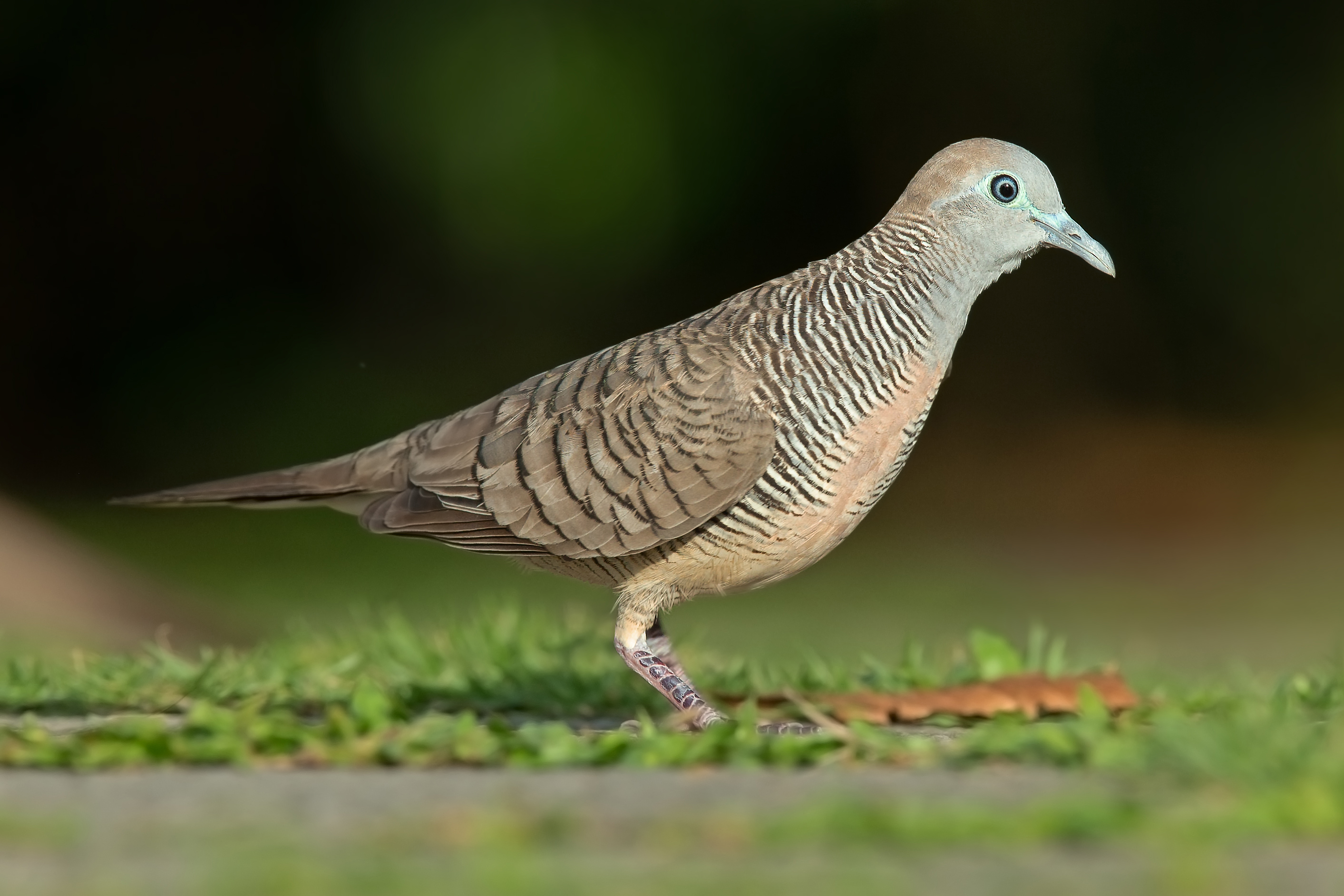
- A zebra dove in Singapore
- A Zebra Dove calling in Philippines

Conservation status
- Least Concern (IUCN 3.1)

Scientific classification
- Kingdom: Animalia
- Phylum: Chordata
- Class: Aves
- Order: Columbiformes
- Family: Columbidae
- Genus: Geopelia
- Species: G. striata

Binomial name
- Geopelia striata (Linnaeus, 1766)

Synonyms
- Columba striata Linnaeus, 1766

= Zebra dove =

Species of dove from Southeast Asia

The zebra dove (Geopelia striata), also known as the barred ground dove, or barred dove, is a species of bird of the dove family, Columbidae, native to Southeast Asia. They are small birds with a long tail, predominantly brownish-grey in colour with black-and-white barring. The species is known for its pleasant, soft, staccato cooing calls.

== Taxonomy ==
In 1743 the English naturalist George Edwards included a description and a picture of the zebra dove in his A Natural History of Uncommon Birds. His drawing was made from a live specimen at the home of admiral Charles Wager in Parsons Green near London. Edwards was told that the dove had been brought from the East Indies. When in 1766 the Swedish naturalist Carl Linnaeus updated his Systema Naturae for the twelfth edition, he included the zebra dove and placed it with all the other pigeons in the genus Columba. Linnaeus included a brief description, coined the binomial name Columba striata and cited Edwards's work. The specific name striata is from the Latin striatus meaning "striated". The type locality has been restricted to the island of Java in Indonesia. The species is now placed in the genus Geopelia that was introduced by the English naturalist William Swainson in 1837. The zebra dove is monotypic: no subspecies are recognised.

The zebra dove is closely related to the peaceful dove of Australia and New Guinea and the barred dove of eastern Indonesia. These two were classified as subspecies of the zebra dove until recently and the names peaceful dove and barred dove were often applied to the whole species.

== Description ==
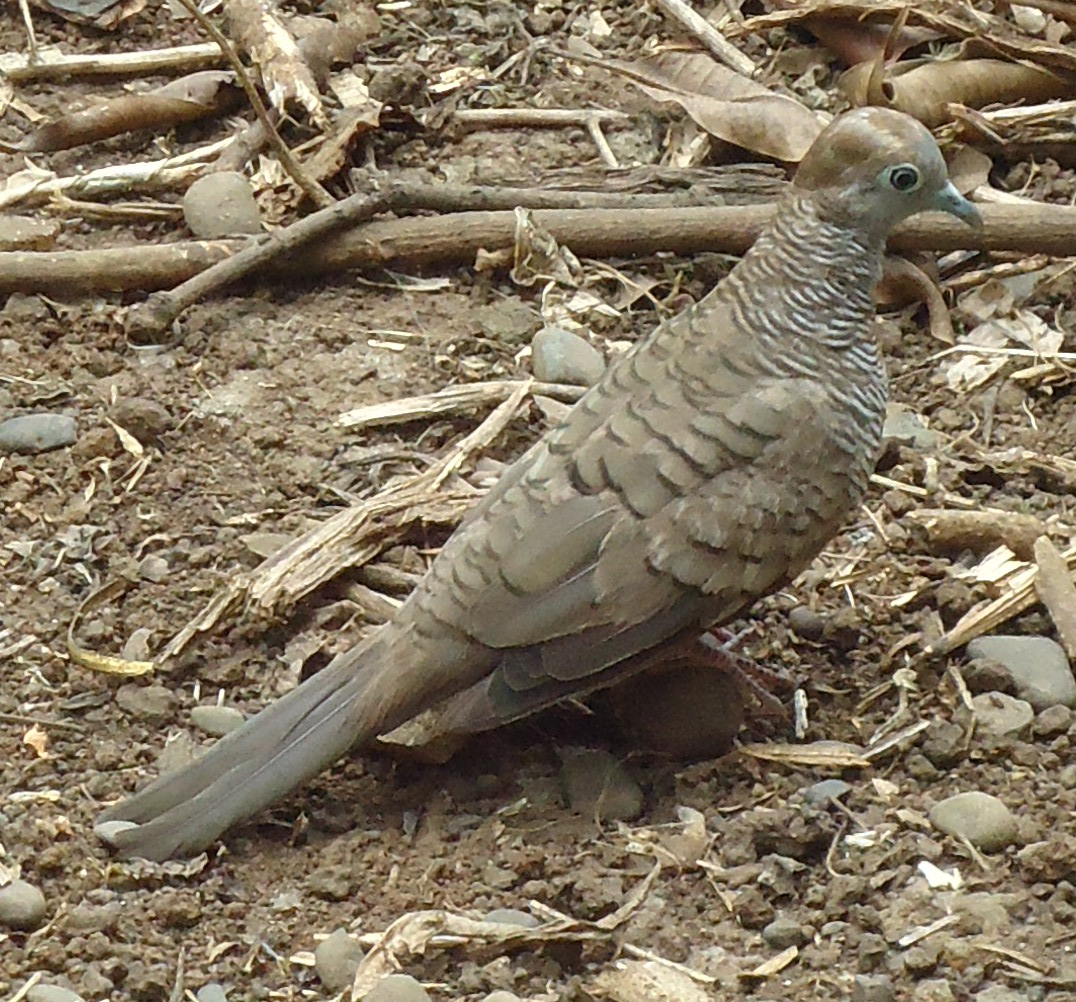
Zebra dove from Mindanao, Philippines.

The birds are small and slender with a long, narrow tail. The upperparts are brownish-grey with black-and-white barring. The underparts are pinkish with black bars on the sides of the neck, breast and belly. The face is blue-grey with bare blue skin around the eyes. There are white tips to the tail feathers. Juveniles are duller and paler than the adults. They can also have brown feathers. Zebra doves are 20–23 centimetres in length with a wingspan of 24–26 cm.

Their call is a series of soft, staccato cooing notes. In Thailand and Indonesia, the birds are popular as pets because of their calls and cooing competitions are held to find the bird with the best voice. In Indonesia this bird is called perkutut. In the Philippines they are known as batobatong katigbe ("pebbled katigbe") and kurokutok, onomatopoeic to their calls. They are also known as tukmo in Filipino, a name also given to the spotted dove (Spilopelia chinensis) and other wild doves. In Malaysia this bird is called merbuk.

== Distribution and habitat ==
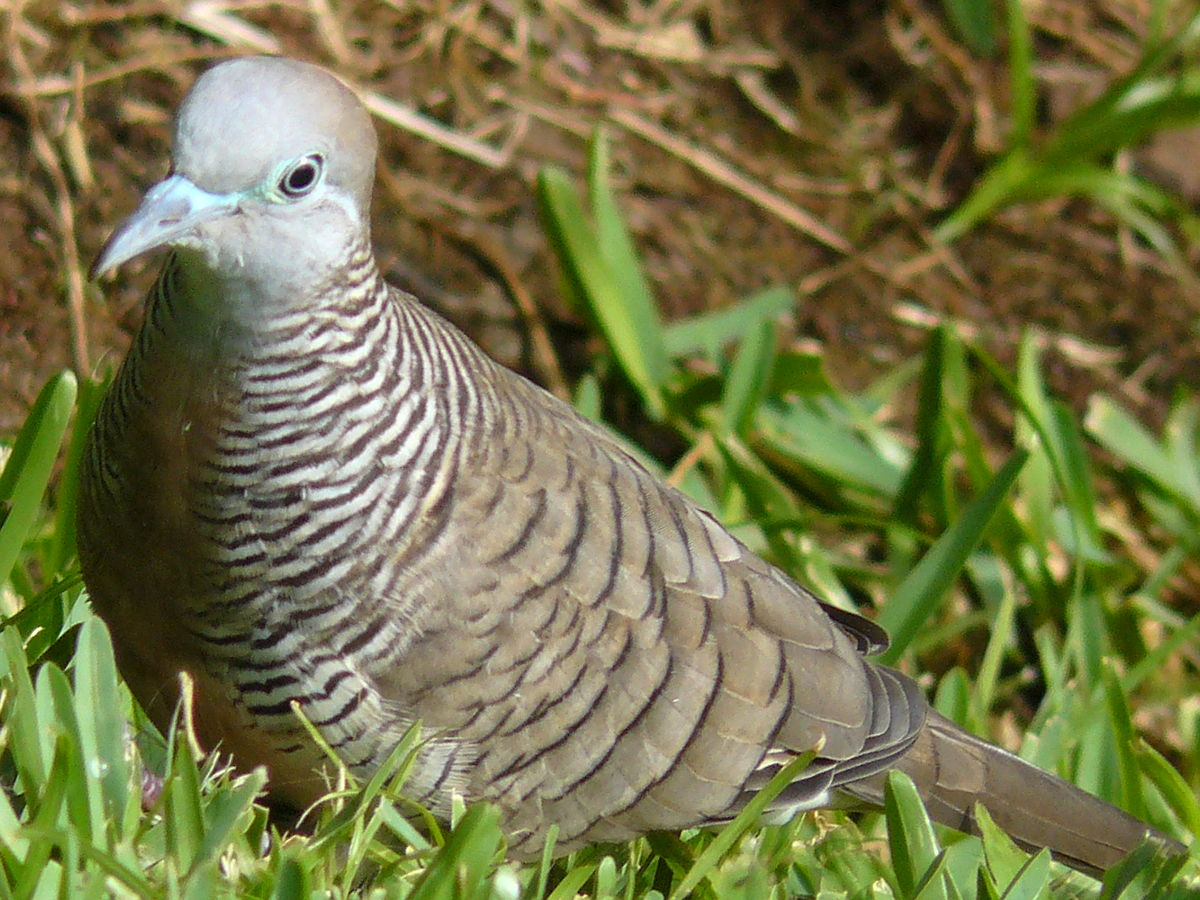
In Maui, Hawaii

The native range of the species extends from Southern Thailand, Tenasserim, Peninsular Malaysia, and Singapore to the Indonesian islands of Sumatra and Java. It may also be native to Borneo, Bali, Lombok, Sumbawa, and the Philippine islands.

The zebra dove is popular in captivity and many populations have appeared outside its native range due to birds escaping or being deliberately released. It can now be found in central Thailand, Laos, Borneo, Sulawesi, Hawaii (introduced in 1922), Tahiti (1950), New Caledonia, the Seychelles, the Chagos Archipelago (1960), Mauritius (before 1768), Réunion, and Saint Helena.

It inhabits scrub, farmland, and open country in lowland areas and is commonly seen in parks and gardens. Trapping for the cagebird industry has led to them becoming rare in parts of Indonesia but in most parts of its range it is common. Zebra doves are among the most abundant birds in some places such as Hawaii and the Seychelles.

== Behaviour and ecology ==
=== Breeding ===
In its native range, the breeding season lasts from September to June. The males perform a courtship display where they bow and coo while raising and spreading the tail. Upon selection of a nesting site, the female will place herself there and will make guttural sounds to attract males to help build the nest. The nest is a simple platform of leaves and grass blades. It is built in a bush or tree or sometimes on the ground and sometimes on window ledges. One or two white eggs are laid and are incubated by both parents for 13 to 18 days. The young leave the nest within two weeks and can fly well after three weeks.

=== Feeding ===
The zebra dove feeds on small grass and weed seeds. They will also eat insects and other small invertebrates. They prefer to forage on bare ground, short grass or on roads, scurrying about with rodent-like movement. Unlike other doves, they forage alone, or in pairs. Their colouration camouflages them well when on the ground.
