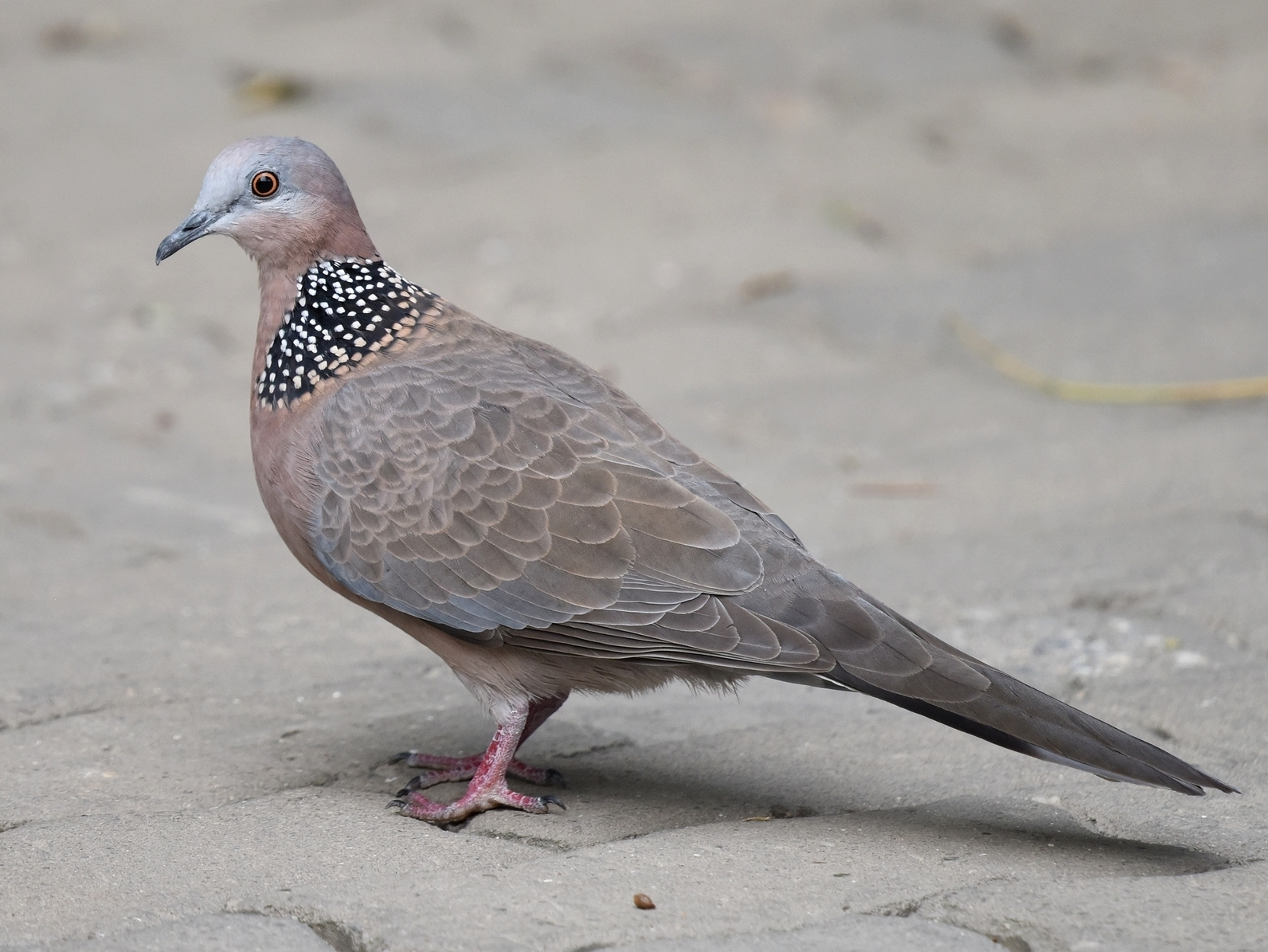
- Spotted dove (Spilopelia chinensis chinensis), Zhengzhou, China

Scientific classification
- Kingdom: Animalia
- Phylum: Chordata
- Class: Aves
- Order: Columbiformes
- Family: Columbidae
- Subfamily: Columbinae
- Genus: Spilopelia; Sundevall, 1873

Species
- See text

Synonyms
- Stigmatopelia Sundevall, 1873

= Spilopelia =

Genus of birds

Spilopelia is a genus of doves that are closely related to Streptopelia and Nesoenas, but distinguished from them by differences in morphology and genetics. Some authors had argued that Stigmatopelia is the valid name as it appears in an earlier line of the same work by the Swedish zoologist Carl Sundevall, (Note: The title page of Sundevall's book gives the year as 1872. The book was issued in two parts and the second part from page 74 that includes Spilopelia was published in 1873.) but Richard Schodde and Ian J. Mason had earlier, in their 1999 zoological catalogue of Australian birds, chosen Spilopelia in treating these two names as applying to the same genus; their choice stands under clause 24(b) of the International Code of Zoological Nomenclature (ICZN) which supports the decision of the first reviser. The name Spilopelia combines the Ancient Greek spilos meaning "spot" and peleia meaning "dove".

- - - - - - - - - Streptopelia decaocto
                - Streptopelia roseogrisea
              - Streptopelia decipiens
            - - Streptopelia capicola
              - Streptopelia vinacea
            - Streptopelia semitorquata
          - - - Streptopelia hypopyrrha
              - Streptopelia turtur
            - Streptopelia orientalis
          - Streptopelia bitorquata
          - Streptopelia tranquebarica
    - - Columba
      - - - Nesoenas mayeri
          - Nesoenas picturatus
        - - Spilopelia chinensis
          - Spilopelia senegalensis
  - Patagioenas

A phylogenetic position based on Johnson et al. (2001). A second possibility is that Columba is a sister of Streptopelia but the remaining clades appear to be monophyletic.

== Species ==
The genus includes just two species:

Genus Spilopelia – Sundevall, 1873 – two species
Common name	Scientific name and subspecies	Range	Size and ecology	IUCN status and estimated population
Spotted dove Spilopelia chinensis suratensis, India	Spilopelia chinensis (Scopoli, 1786) Five subspecies: Spilopelia chinensis suratensis (Gmelin, JF, 1789); Spilopelia chinensis ceylonensis (Reichenbach, 1851); Spilopelia chinensis tigrina (Temminck, 1809); Spilopelia chinensis chinensis (Scopoli, 1786); Spilopelia chinensis hainana (Hartert, 1910)	Indian subcontinent and in East and Southeast Asia	Size: 27–30 cm; 125–130 g Habitat: moist woodland, gardens Diet: seeds including grain, small fruit	LC increasing
Laughing dove Spilopelia senegalensis senegalensis, Botswana	Spilopelia senegalensis (Linnaeus, 1766) Five subspecies: Spilopelia senegalensis phoenicophila (Hartert, 1916); Spilopelia senegalensis aegyptiaca (Latham, 1790); Spilopelia senegalensis senegalensis (Linnaeus, 1766); Spilopelia senegalensis cambayensis (Gmelin, JF, 1789); Spilopelia senegalensis ermanni (Bonaparte, 1856)	Africa, the Middle East, South Asia	Size: 23–27 cm; 71–92 g Habitat: villages, gardens, dry woodland, savanna Diet: seeds including grain, small fruit, insects	LC increasing

Some ornithologists split the spotted dove into the eastern spotted dove (Spilopelia chinensis) and the western spotted dove (Spilopelia suratensis), but this has not to date been accepted by the IOC.
