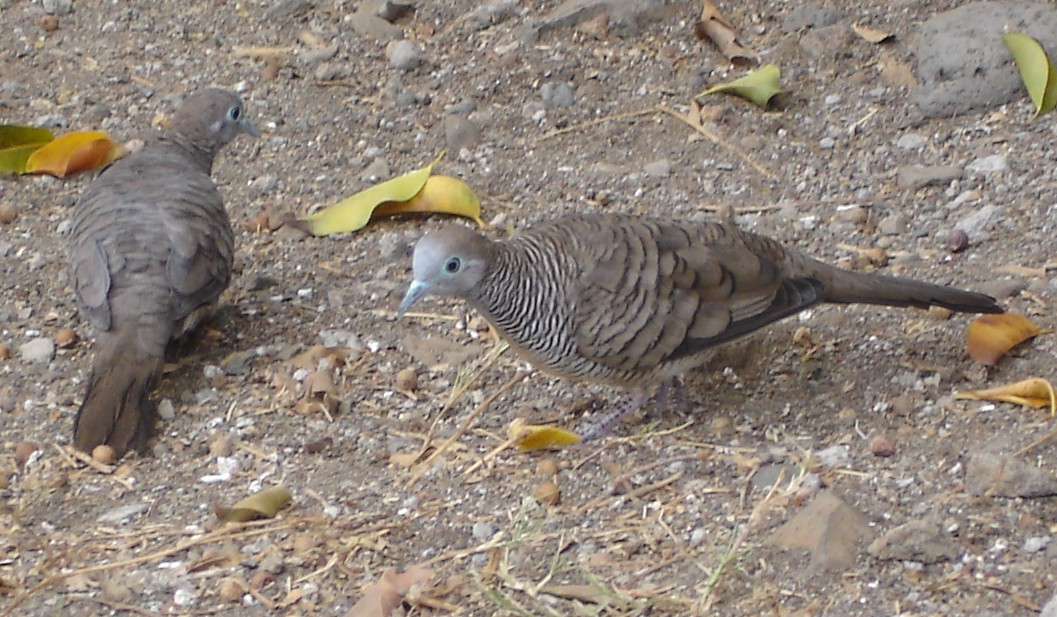
- Zebra doves (Geopelia striata)

Scientific classification
- Kingdom: Animalia
- Phylum: Chordata
- Class: Aves
- Order: Columbiformes
- Family: Columbidae
- Tribe: Phabini
- Genus: Geopelia; Swainson, 1837

Type species
- Geopelia lineata Swainson, 1837

Species
- See text.

= Geopelia =

Genus of doves

Geopelia is a genus of small, long-tailed doves in the family Columbidae. They are native to South-east Asia and Australasia and are most often found in open country and scrubland. They feed mainly on seeds which they find by foraging on the ground. They typically lay two eggs in a simple nest of twigs and grass. Their plumage is mostly greyish-brown with a pattern of spots or bars. The zebra dove and diamond dove are commonly kept in captivity.

The genus was introduced in 1837 by the English naturalist William Swainson with the zebra dove (Geopelia striata) as the type species. The name of the genus combines the Ancient Greek geō- meaning "ground-" and peleia meaning "dove".

The genus contains five species:

- Diamond dove, Geopelia cuneata
- Zebra dove, Geopelia striata
- Peaceful dove, Geopelia placida (sometimes treated as a subspecies of G. striata)
- Barred dove, Geopelia maugeus (sometimes treated as a subspecies of G. striata)
- Bar-shouldered dove, Geopelia humeralis
