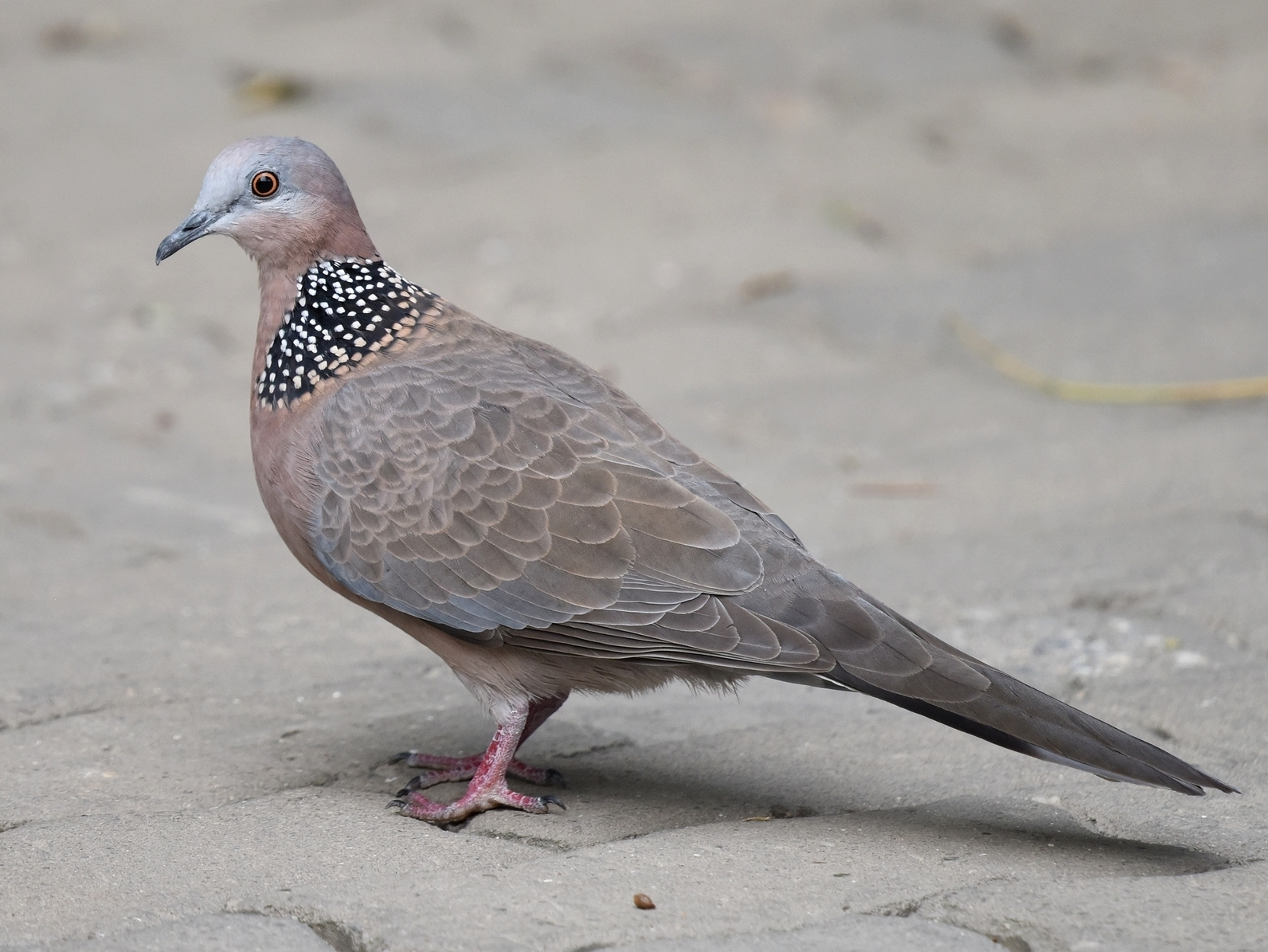
- S. c. chinensis in Zhengzhou, China

Conservation status
- Least Concern (IUCN 3.1)

Scientific classification
- Kingdom: Animalia
- Phylum: Chordata
- Class: Aves
- Order: Columbiformes
- Family: Columbidae
- Genus: Spilopelia
- Species: S. chinensis

Binomial name
- Spilopelia chinensis (Scopoli, 1786)

Subspecies
- See text

Synonyms
- Streptopelia chinensis; Stigmatopelia chinensis; Turtur suratensis

Audio
- Song of S. chinensis chinensis in Taiwan

= Spotted dove =

Species of bird

The spotted dove or eastern spotted dove (Spilopelia chinensis) is a small and somewhat long-tailed pigeon that is a common resident breeding bird across its native range on the Indian subcontinent and in East and Southeast Asia. The species has been introduced to many parts of the world and feral populations have become established.

This species was formerly included in the genus Streptopelia with other turtle-doves, but studies suggest that they differ from typical members of that genus. This dove is long tailed buff brown with a white-spotted black collar patch on the back and sides of the neck. The tail tips are white and the wing coverts have light buff spots.

There are considerable plumage variations across populations within its wide range. The species is found in light forests and gardens as well as in urban areas. They fly from the ground with an explosive flutter and will sometimes glide down to a perch. It is also called the mountain dove, pearl-necked dove, lace-necked dove, and spotted turtle-dove.

== Taxonomy ==
The spotted dove was formally described in 1786 by the Austrian naturalist Giovanni Antonio Scopoli and given the binomial name Columba chinensis. Scopoli based his account on "La tourterelle gris de la Chine" that had been described and illustrated in 1782 by the French naturalist Pierre Sonnerat in the second volume of his book Voyage aux Indes orientales et à la Chine.

This species was formerly included in the genus Streptopelia. A molecular phylogenetic study published in 2001 found the genus was paraphyletic with respect to Columba. To create monophyletic genera the spotted dove as well as the closely related laughing dove were moved to the resurrected genus Spilopelia that had been introduced by the Swedish zoologist Carl Sundevall in 1873. Sundevall had designated Columba tigrina as the type species, a taxon that is now considered a subspecies of the spotted dove.

=== Subspecies ===
Several subspecies have been proposed for the plumage and size variation seen in different geographic populations. The nominate form is from China (Canton), which is also the origin of the introduced population in Hawaii. Subspecies formosa from Taiwan has been considered as doubtful and indistinguishable from the nominate population. The population in India suratensis (type locality Surat) and ceylonensis from Sri Lanka have fine rufous or buff spots on the back. There is a size reduction trend with specimens from southern India being smaller, and ceylonensis may merely be a part of this cline. The lesser and median wing-coverts are also spotted at the tip in buff. This spotting is lacking on populations further north and east of India, such as tigrina, which also differ greatly in vocalizations from the Indian forms. The population from Hainan Island is placed in hainana. Others like vacillans (=chinensis) and forresti (= tigrina) and edwardi (from Chabua = suratensis) have been considered invalid. The subspecies S. c. suratensis and S. c. ceylonensis differ significantly from the other subspecies in both plumage and vocalization. This has led some ornithologists to treat S. c. suratensis as a separate species, the western spotted dove.

Five subspecies are recognised:

Image	Subspecies	Distribution	Notes
	S. c. suratensis (Gmelin, JF, 1789)	Pakistan, India, Nepal and Bhutan	
	S. c. ceylonensis (Reichenbach, 1851)	Sri Lanka	shorter wings than suratensis
	S. c. tigrina (Temminck, 1809)	Bangladesh and northeast India through Indochina to Philippines and the Sunda Islands	
	S. c. chinensis (Scopoli, 1786)	northeast Myanmar to central and east China, Taiwan	
	S. c. hainana (Hartert, 1910)	Hainan (off southeast China)	

== Description ==
Measurements

Nominate (Chinese population)
Length	♂	300–340 mm (11.8–13.4 in)
	♀	295–330 mm (11.6–13.0 in)
Culmen	♂	15.5–19 mm (0.6–0.7 in)
	♀	15.5–18 mm (0.6–0.7 in)
Wing	♂	154–163 mm (6.1–6.4 in)
	♀	148–160 mm (5.8–6.3 in)
Tail	♂	155–165 mm (6.1–6.5 in)
	♀	137–160 mm (5.4–6.3 in)
Tarsus	♂	23–25 mm (0.9–1.0 in)
	♀	21–24 mm (0.8–0.9 in)
Weight	♂	162–200 g (5.7–7.1 oz)
	♀	150–205 g (5.3–7.2 oz)

Nominate (Taiwanese population)
Culmen	♂	16 mm (0.63 in)
	♀	15.8–17.6 mm (0.6–0.7 in)
Wing	♂	146 mm (5.7 in)
	♀	148.5–157 mm (5.8–6.2 in)
Tail	♂	152 mm (6.0 in)
	♀	132–145.5 mm (5.2–5.7 in)
Tarsus	♂	24.5 mm (0.96 in)
	♀	23.8 mm (0.94 in)

S. c. suratensis
Culmen	♂	18–21 mm (0.7–0.8 in)
	♀	19–21 mm (0.7–0.8 in)
Wing	♂	135–146 mm (5.3–5.7 in)
	♀	132–143 mm (5.2–5.6 in)
Tail	♂	118–143 mm (4.6–5.6 in)
	♀	117–133 mm (4.6–5.2 in)
Tarsus	♂	21–24 mm (0.8–0.9 in)
	♀	20–24 mm (0.8–0.9 in)

S. c. hainana
Length	♂	275–305 mm (10.8–12.0 in)
	♀	272–315 mm (10.7–12.4 in)
Culmen	♂	15–17 mm (0.6–0.7 in)
	♀	15–17 mm (0.6–0.7 in)
Wing	♂	139–157 mm (5.5–6.2 in)
	♀	137–149 mm (5.4–5.9 in)
Tail	♂	131–140 mm (5.2–5.5 in)
	♀	123–146 mm (4.8–5.7 in)
Tarsus	♂	23–25 mm (0.9–1.0 in)
	♀	20–26 mm (0.8–1.0 in)
Weight	♂	120–142 g (4.2–5.0 oz)
	♀	120–145 g (4.2–5.1 oz)

S. c. tigrina
Length	♂	300–305 mm (11.8–12.0 in)
	♀	310–320 mm (12.2–12.6 in)
Culmen	♂	15–17 mm (0.6–0.7 in)
	♀	15–16 mm (0.6–0.6 in)
Wing	♂	148 mm (5.8 in)
	♀	144 mm (5.7 in)
Tail	♂	151–156 mm (5.9–6.1 in)
	♀	147–158 mm (5.8–6.2 in)
Tarsus	♂	24–24.5 mm (0.9–1.0 in)
	♀	24–25 mm (0.9–1.0 in)
Weight	♂	130–190 g (4.6–6.7 oz)
	♀	130–156 g (4.6–5.5 oz)

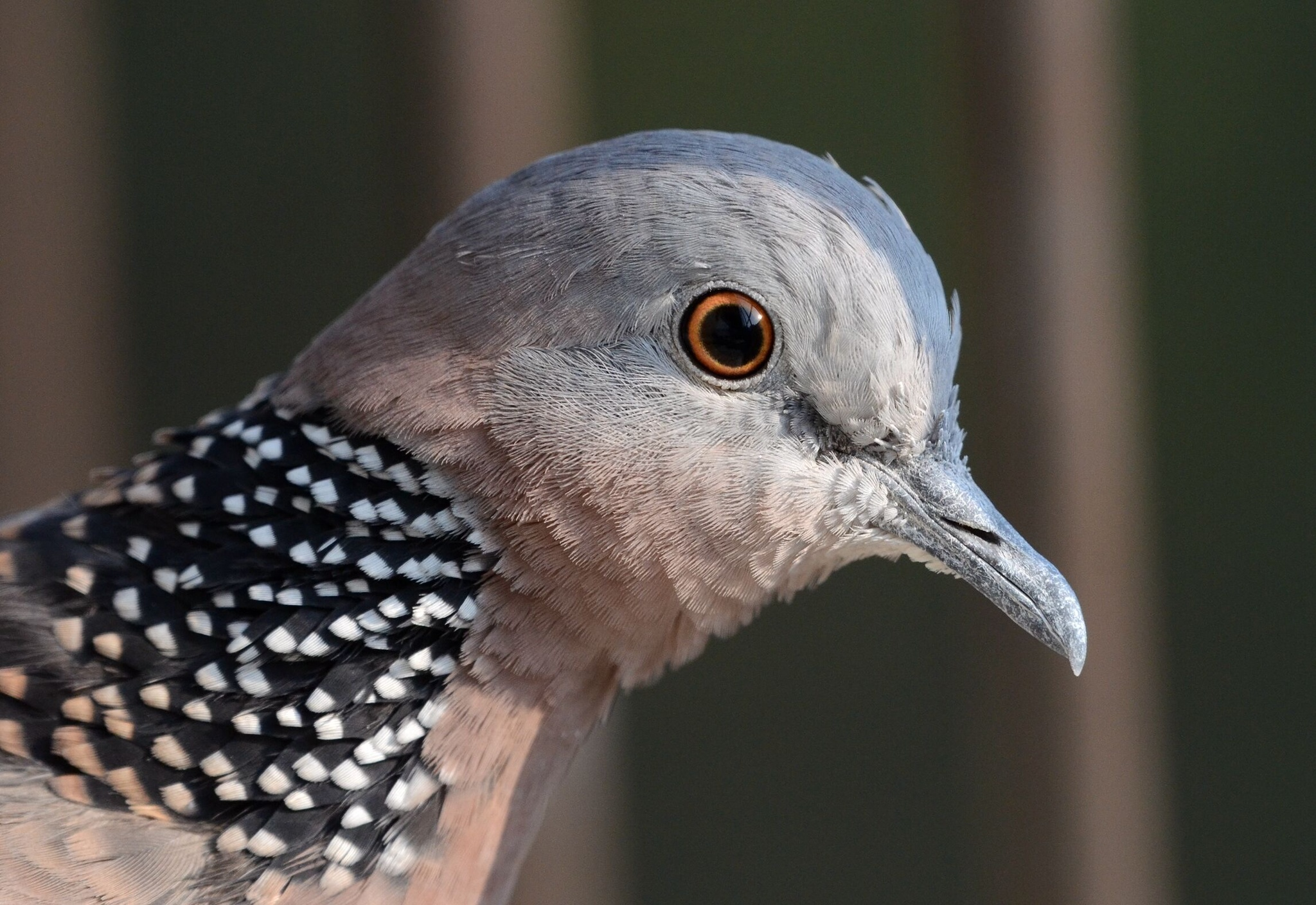
A close-up of the head

The ground colour of this long and slim dove is rosy buff below shading into grey on the head and belly. There is a half collar on the back and sides of the neck made of black feathers that bifurcate and have white spots at the two tips. The median coverts have brown feathers tipped with rufous spots in the Indian and Sri Lankan subspecies which are divided at the tip by a widening grey shaft streak.

The wing feathers are dark brown with grey edges. The centre of the abdomen and vent are white. The outer tail feathers are tipped in white and become visible when the bird takes off. Sexes are similar, but juveniles are duller than adults and do not acquire the neck spots until they are mature. The length ranges from 28 to 32 centimetres (11.2 to 12.8 inches).

Abnormal plumages such as leucism can sometimes occur in the wild.

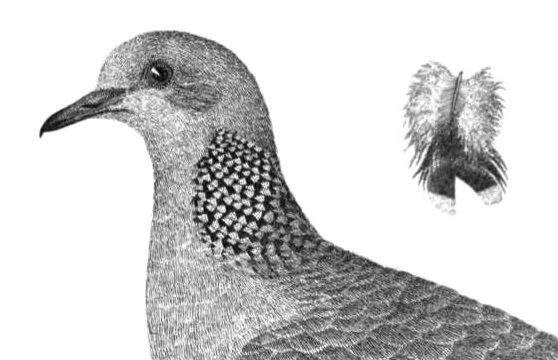
The bifid neck feathers

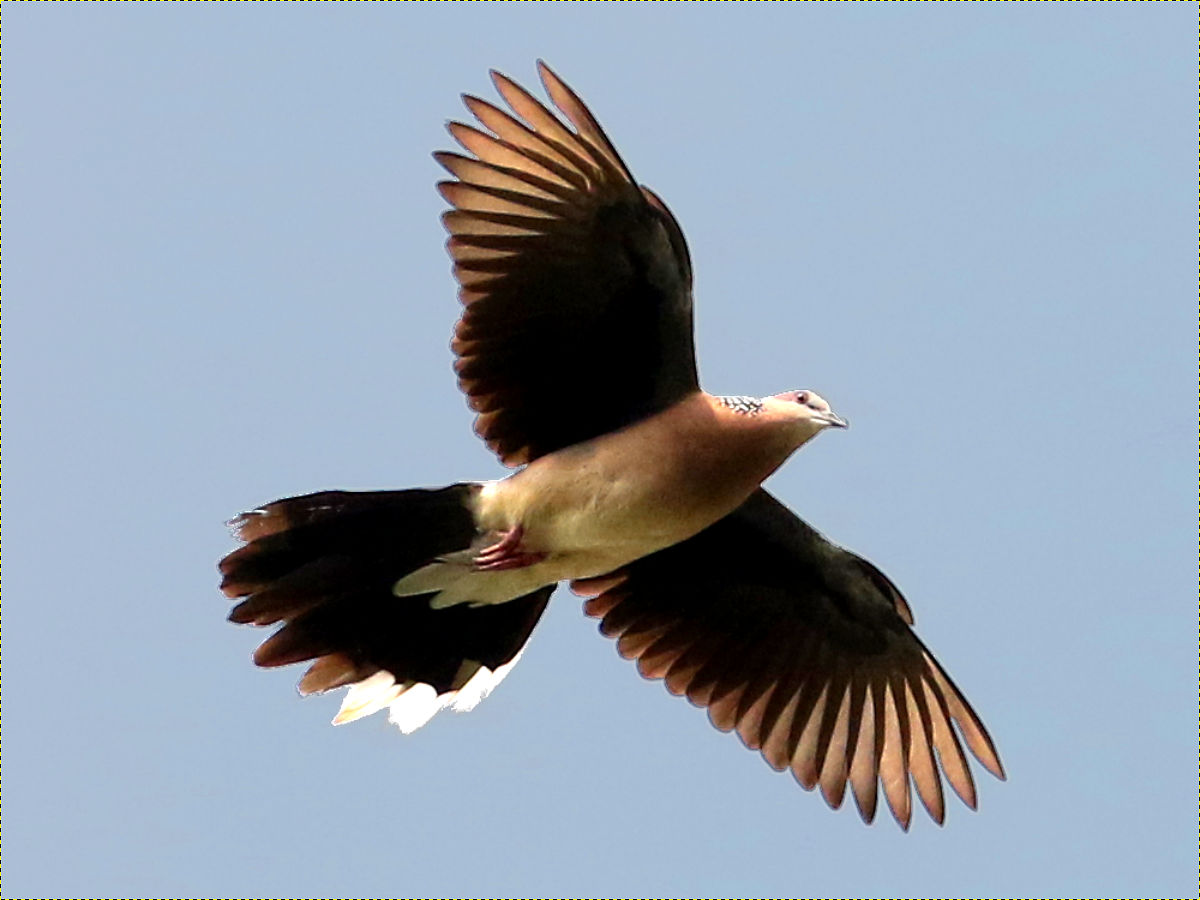
In flight

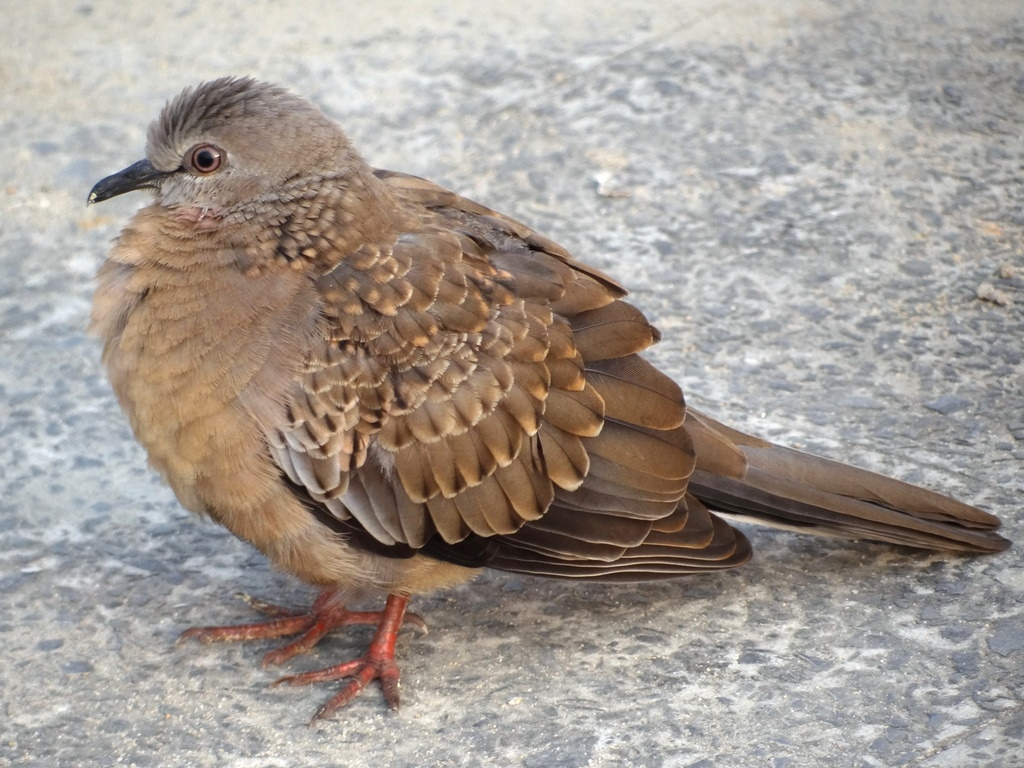
A juvenile bird

== Distribution and habitat ==
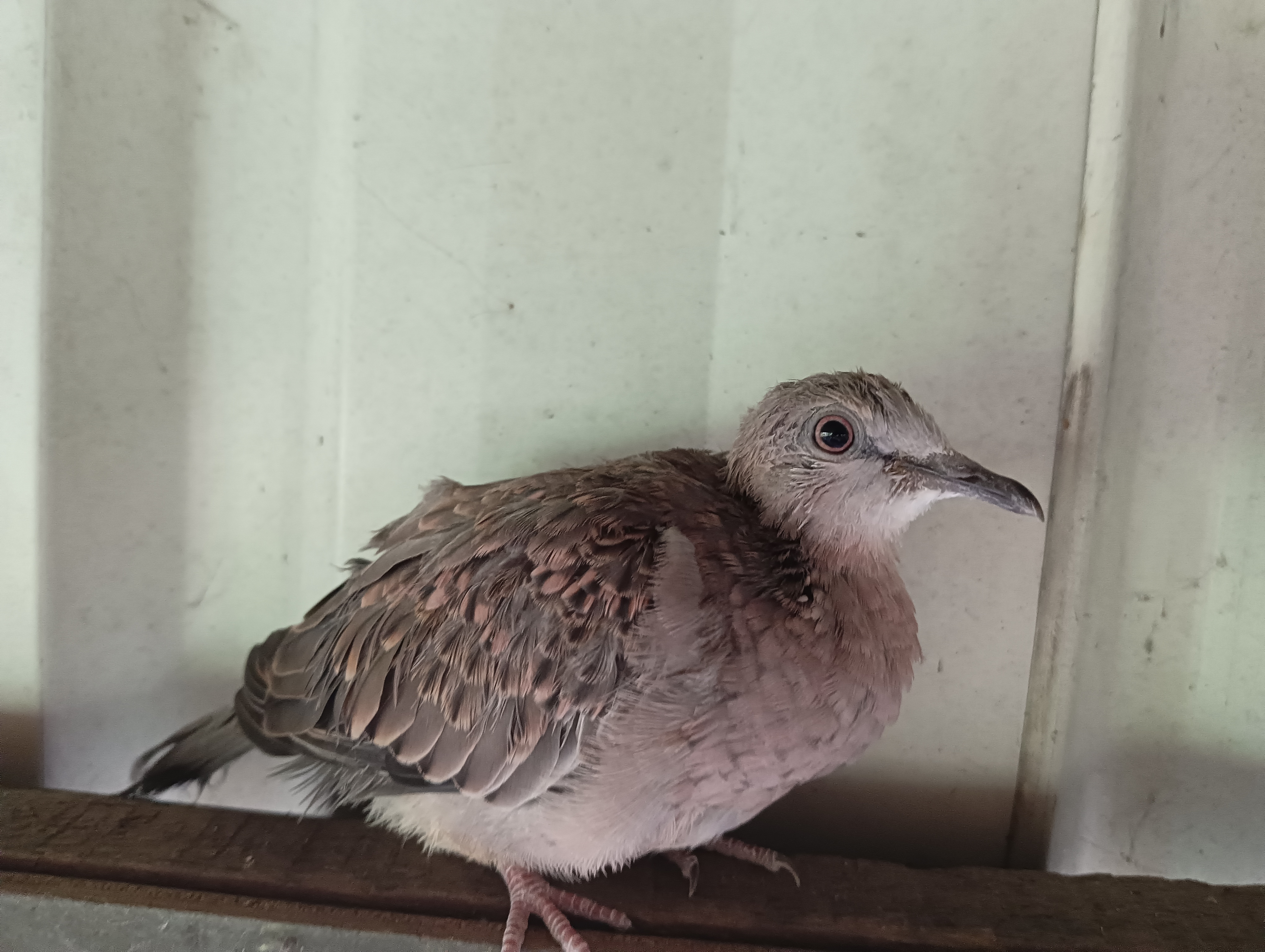
A juvenile spotted dove molting feathers

The spotted dove in its native range in Asia is found across a range of habitats including woodland, scrub, farmland and habitation. In India it tends to be found in the moister regions, with the laughing dove (S. senegalensis) appearing more frequently in drier areas. These doves are mostly found on the ground where they forage for seeds and grain or on low vegetation.

The species has become established in many areas outside its native range. These areas include Hawaii, southern California, Mauritius, Australia and New Zealand.

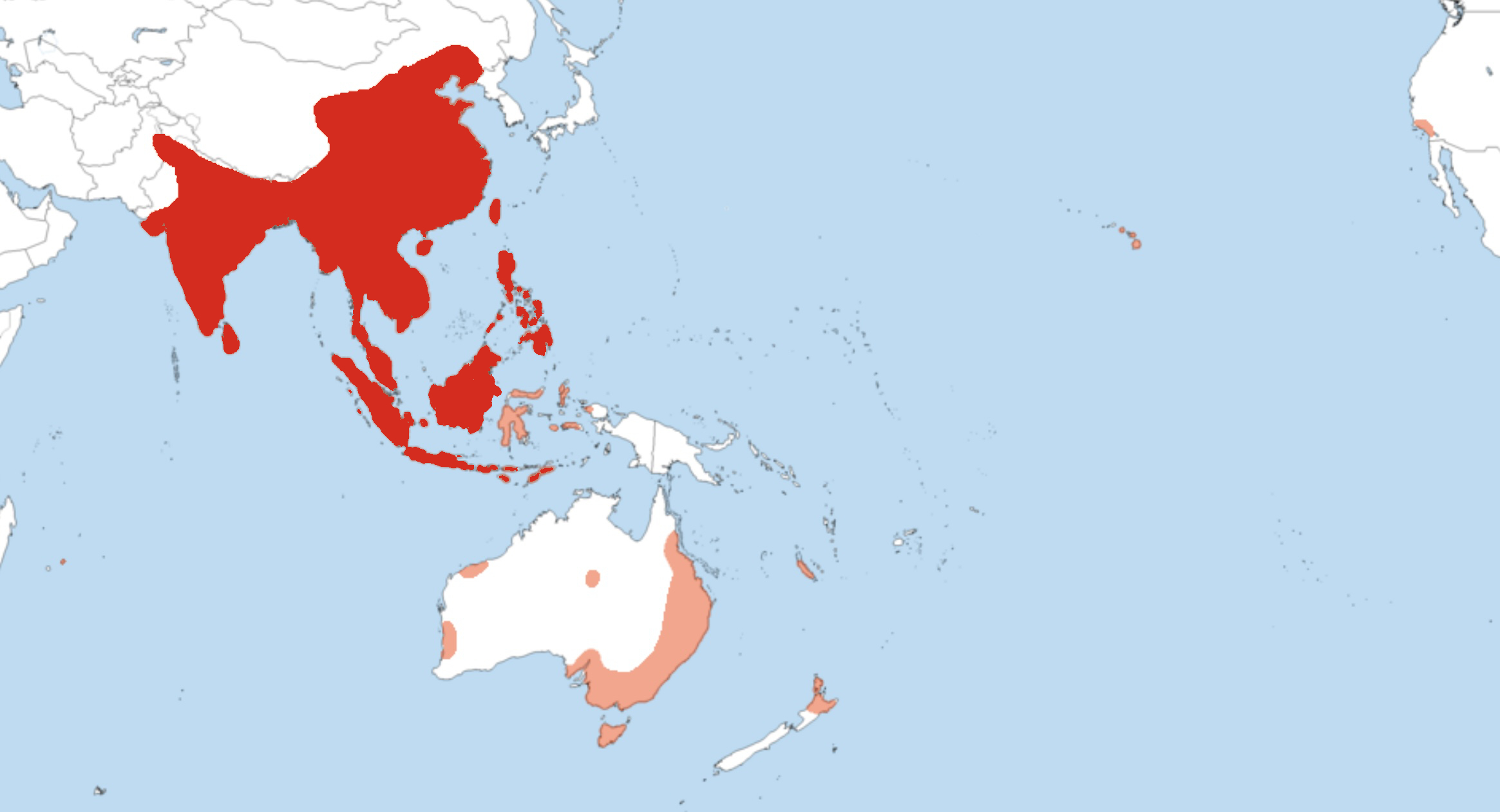
Spotted Pigeon Habitat Map

In Australia they were introduced into Melbourne in the 1860s and have since spread out, but there is insufficient evidence that they compete with native doves. They are now a common urban wildlife species found in streets, parks, gardens, agricultural areas, and tropical shrublands in diverse locations throughout eastern Australia and around the cities and major towns across southern Australia. The original populations appear to be S. c. chinensis and S. c. tigrina in varying proportions.

== Behaviour and ecology ==
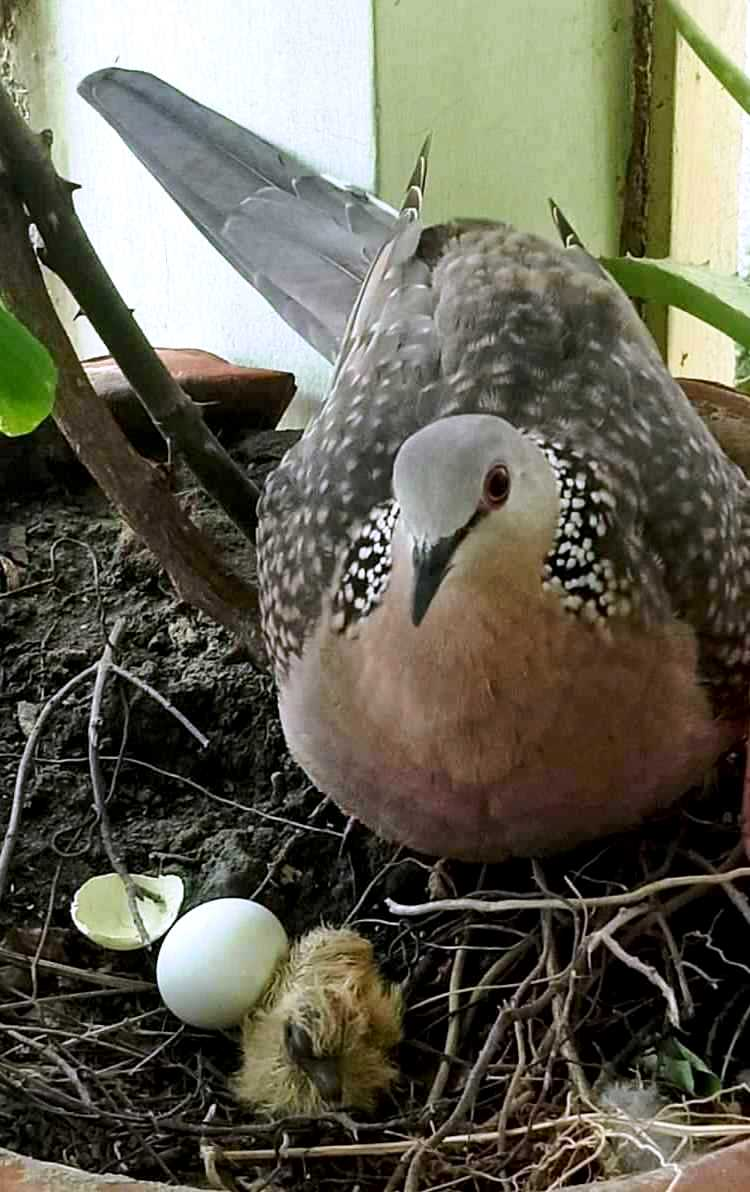
S. c. suratensis with a hatchling and egg at nest

Spotted doves move around in pairs or small groups as they forage on the ground for grass seeds, grains, fallen fruits and seeds of other plants. They may however take insects occasionally and have been recorded feeding on winged termites. The flight is quick with regular beats and an occasional sharp flick of the wings. A display flight involves taking off at a steep angle with a loud clapping of the wing and then slowly gliding down with the tail spread out. The breeding season is spread out in warm regions but tends to be in summer in the temperate ranges. In Hawaii, they breed all year round, as do all three other introduced species of doves. Males coo, bow and make aerial displays in courtship. In southern Australia, they breed mostly from September to January, and in the north in autumn. They nest mainly in low vegetation, building a flimsy cup of twigs in which two whitish eggs are laid. Nests are sometimes placed on the ground or on buildings and other structures. Both parents take part in building the nest, incubating and feeding the young. The eggs hatch after about 13 days and fledge after a fortnight. More than one brood may be raised.

The vocalizations of the spotted dove include cooing softly with a Krookruk-krukroo... kroo kroo kroo with the number of terminal kroos varying in the Indian population and absent in tigrina, chinensis and other populations to the east.

The species has been extending its range in many parts of the world. Populations may sometimes rise and fall rapidly, within a span of about five years. In the Philippines, the species may be outcompeting the Streptopelia dusumieri. Their habit of flushing into the air when disturbed makes them a hazard on airfields, often colliding with aircraft and sometimes causing damage.
