= Dove (disambiguation) =

Dove is the common name for several birds in the Columbidae family.

Dove may also refer to:

== Birds ==
- In popular usage, often refers to small columbids that are used as symbols of peace, white or gray in color
  - Barbary dove (Streptopelia risoria), a domestic species that is typically gray in colour, but often bred to be white
  - Small white-feathered domestic pigeons (Columba livia domestica), which are used as release doves

== People ==
- Dove (given name), given name in the English language
- Dove (surname), surname in the English language

== Places ==
=== Extraterrestrial ===
- Dove (crater), on the Moon
- Dove or Columba (constellation)

=== Terrestrial ===
- Dove, Missouri, United States
- Dove Holes, Derbyshire, England
- Dove Lake (Tasmania), Australia
- Dove River (Canterbury), New Zealand
- Dove River (Tasman), New Zealand
- River Dove, Barnsley, England
- River Dove, Derbyshire, England
- River Dove, North Yorkshire, England
- River Dove, Suffolk, England
- The Dove (glacier), Colorado, United States
- The Dove, Hammersmith, a public house in London, England
- Dove Cottage, writer's home museum of William Wordsworth in Grasmere, England

== Arts, entertainment, and media ==
=== Fictional characters ===
- Hawk and Dove, a DC Comics superhero team
- "Little Dove", an alias for the character Sansa Stark in Game of Thrones

=== Music ===
==== Groups ====
- Dove (band), an Australian soft rock band (1973–1978)
- Doves (band), an English band

==== Albums ====
- Dove (Belly album), an album by American alternative rock band Belly
- Dove (Floor album), an album by American sludge metal band Floor

==== Songs ====
- "Dove" (song), a song by Italian musician Mooney
- "Dove", a song by Tyrannosaurus Rex from their 1970 album A Beard of Stars

==== Other uses in music ====
- Dove, an alias of American rapper David Jude Jolicoeur
- Dove (the Band of Love), Devo's fake opening act
- GMA Dove Awards, an American musical award
- Gibson Dove, a type of guitar

=== Other uses in media ===
- "Doves", a Series D episode of the television series QI (2006)
- Doves (Group), a 1927 sculpture by Barbara Hepworth

== Brands and enterprises ==
- Dove (chocolate brand), a brand of chocolate made by Mars
- Dove (Unilever brand), a brand of soap and other personal care products by Unilever
- The Dove Foundation

== Military ==
- HMS Dove (1898), a British destroyer
- Operation Dove (Ireland), an aborted 1940 German World War II mission
- Operation Dove, a 1944 Allied World War II assault in southern France

== Science and technology ==
- Dove (satellite), a constellation of small Earth-imaging satellites operated by Planet Labs
- Distributed Overlay Virtual Ethernet (DOVE), a tunneling and virtualization technology for computer networks
- Dove Marine Laboratory
- Dove tree
- Dove Medical Press

== Vehicles ==
- Dove (ship), 17th-century English trading ship re-created as the Maryland Dove
- Dove (steamboat)
- de Havilland Dove, a post–World War II short-haul airliner

== Other uses ==
- DoVE (Digitisation of Vital Events), a project of the General Register Office for England and Wales to digitise birth, marriage, and death records
- Dove Foundation, an American non-profit organization based in Portland, Oregon
- Dove Publications, an American publishing house headquartered in Mineola, New York
- Dove, slang for methylenedioxymethamphetamine
- Basel Dove, an 1845 Swiss postage stamp
- Monetary hawk and dove, someone who favors low unemployment in monetary policy
- War dove, a person favoring peace in a debate over whether to go to war
- Doves (Gibraltar) or palomos, a group of Gibraltarians that advocated, in the 1960s, for a settlement with Spain

== See also ==
- Doves as symbols
- Doves Press
- Dovedale (disambiguation)
- Hawk and dove (disambiguation)
- The Dove (disambiguation)
