= The Dove =

The Dove may refer to:

- The Dove (1927 film), a silent film starring Norma Talmadge, Noah Beery, and Gilbert Roland
- The Dove (1968 film), a short parody of Ingmar Bergman's works
- The Dove (1974 film), a biographical movie about an around-the-world sailor
- The Dove (fairy tale), written in 1634 by Giambattista Basile
- The Dove, Hammersmith, public house in Hammersmith, London
- The Dove (glacier), a small glacier located in Rocky Mountain National Park, Colorado, United States
- "The Dove", nickname of radio station WDUV
- Maryland Dove, a replica of the ship The Dove, which was used in founding the Province of Maryland
- Al-Yamamah arms deal, the name of a series of record arms sales by the United Kingdom to Saudi Arabia

== See also ==
- Dove (disambiguation)
- Doves Press
