= Porter (beer) =

Dark style of beer

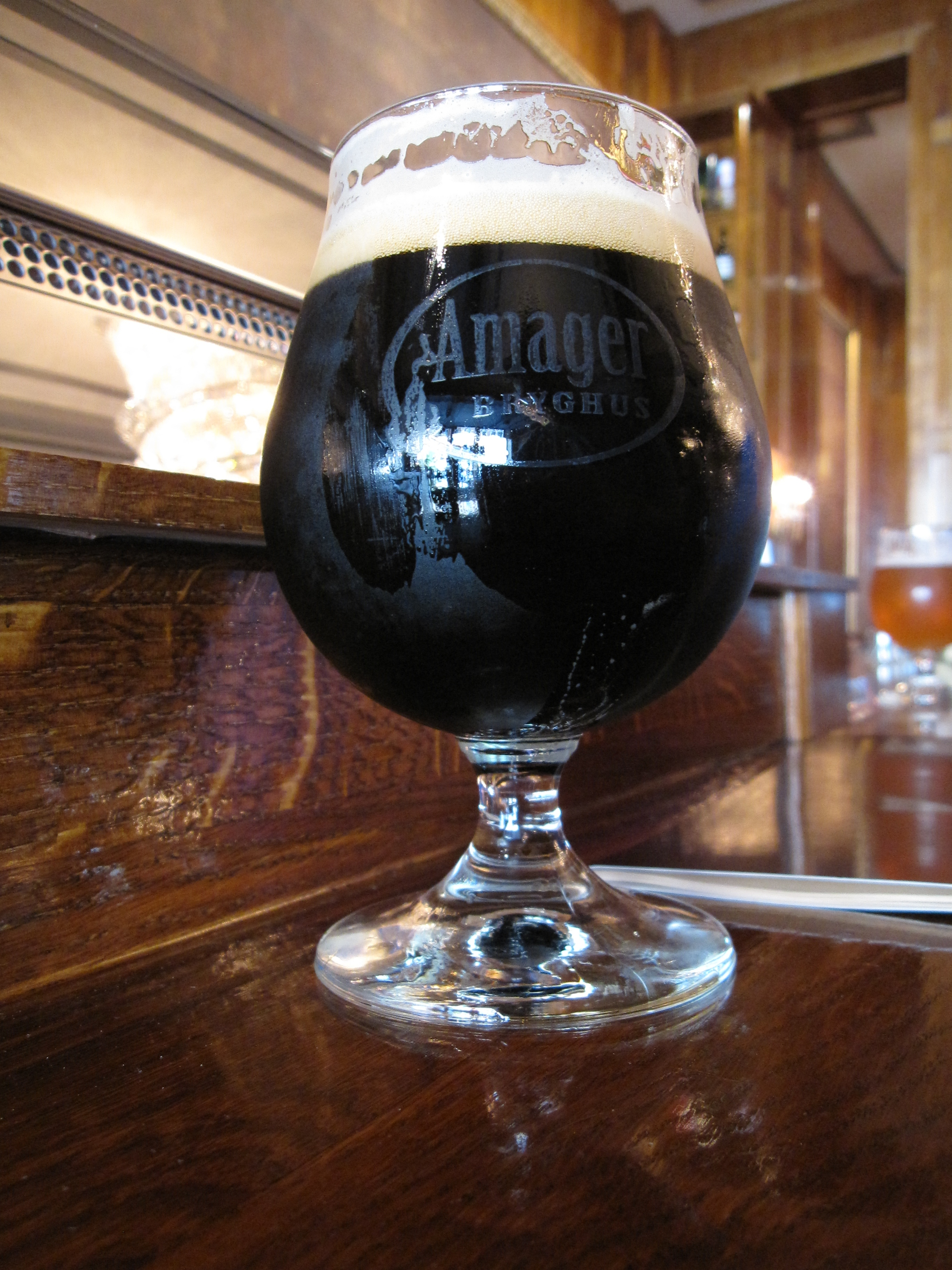
A glass of porter, showing characteristic dark body

Porter is a style of beer that was developed in London in the early 18th century. It is well-hopped and dark in appearance, owing to the use of brown malt. The name is believed to have originated from its popularity with porters. Porter became the first beer style brewed around the world, being produced in Great Britain, the Baltic states, Finland, Ireland, North America, Poland, Sweden, and Imperial Russia by the end of the 18th century.

The history of stout and porter is intertwined. The name "stout", used for a dark beer, came about because strong porters were marketed as "stout porter", later being shortened to just stout. Guinness Extra Stout was originally called "Extra Superior Porter" and was not given the name "Extra Stout" until 1840. Today, the terms stout and porter are used by different breweries almost interchangeably to describe dark beers, and have more in common than in distinction.

== History ==
=== 18th and 19th centuries ===
==== Great Britain ====
Porter was first mentioned in 1721, as a development of the brown beer already being produced across London, and delivered to publicans to age and blend to their customers' tastes; the term had become common in print by the 1760s, but was often not used by the brewers themselves before then. The innovation is attributed to Ralph Harwood, a brewer at the Bell Brewhouse in Shoreditch. The first delivery of porter was claimed to be to the Blue Last pub in Shoreditch.

Before 1700, London brewers sent out their beer very young, as "Milds"; any ageing into "Stale" styles was either performed by the publican or a dealer, with blends of Milds and Stales often sold to the public. Porter was one of the first beer styles to be aged at the brewery and dispatched in a condition fit to be drunk immediately. It was also a style that could be made on a large scale, and the London porter brewers, such as Whitbread, Truman, Parsons, and Thrale, achieved economies of scale, and financial success.

According to Martyn Cornell, "London-brewed Porter was the first beer to be widely exported, reaching Ireland by the 1730s, North America and the Baltic lands by the 1740s, Northern Europe by the 1760s, and India around the same time".

Early London porters were strong beers by modern standards. Early trials with the hydrometer in the 1770s recorded porter as having an original gravity (OG) of 1.071 and 6.6% alcohol by volume (ABV). Increased taxation during the Napoleonic Wars pushed its gravity down to around 1.055, where it remained for the rest of the 19th century. The popularity of the style prompted brewers to produce porters in a wide variety of strengths. These started with Single Stout Porter around 1.066, Double Stout Porter (such as Guinness) at 1.072, Triple Stout Porter at 1.078 and Imperial Stout Porter at 1.095 and more. As the 19th century progressed, the porter suffix was gradually dropped.

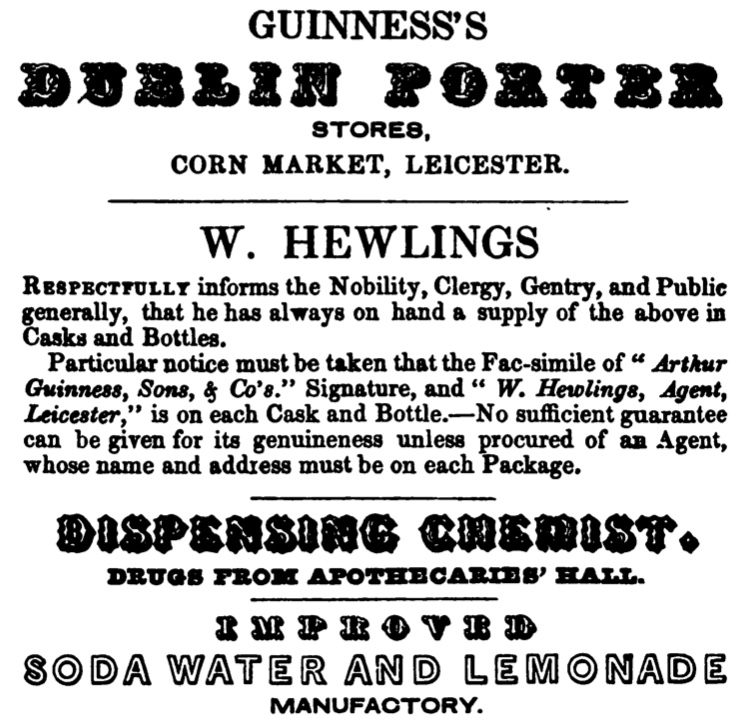
Advertisement for Guinness Porter, 1840

The large London porter breweries pioneered many technological advances, such as the use of the thermometer (about 1760) and the hydrometer (1770). The use of the latter transformed the nature of porter. The first porters were brewed from 100% brown malt. Now, brewers were able to accurately measure the yield of the malt they used, and noticed that brown malt, though cheaper than pale malt, only produced about two-thirds as much fermentable material. When the malt tax was increased to help pay for the Napoleonic War, brewers had an incentive to use less malt. Their solution was to use a proportion of pale malt and add colouring to obtain the expected hue. When a law was passed in 1816 allowing only malt and hops to be used in the production of beer (a sort of British Reinheitsgebot), they were left in a quandary. Their problem was solved by Wheeler's invention of the almost black (kilned) patent malt in 1817. It was now possible to brew porter from 95% pale malt and 5% patent malt, though most London brewers continued to use some brown malt for flavour.

Until about 1800, all London porter was matured in large vats, often holding several hundred barrels, for six to 18 months before being racked into smaller casks to be delivered to pubs. Ageing all porter was found to be unnecessary. A small quantity of highly aged beer (18 months or more) mixed with fresh or "mild" porter produced a flavour similar to that of aged beer. It was a cheaper method of producing porter, as it required less beer to be stored for long periods. The normal blend was around two parts young beer to one part old.

After 1860, as the popularity of porter and the aged taste began to wane, porter was increasingly sold "mild". In the final decades of the century, many breweries discontinued their porter, but continued to brew one or two stouts. Those that persisted with porter, brewed it weaker and with less hops. Between 1860 and 1914, the gravity dropped from 1.058 to 1.050 and the hopping rate from two to one pound per 36-gallon barrel.

==== Ireland ====
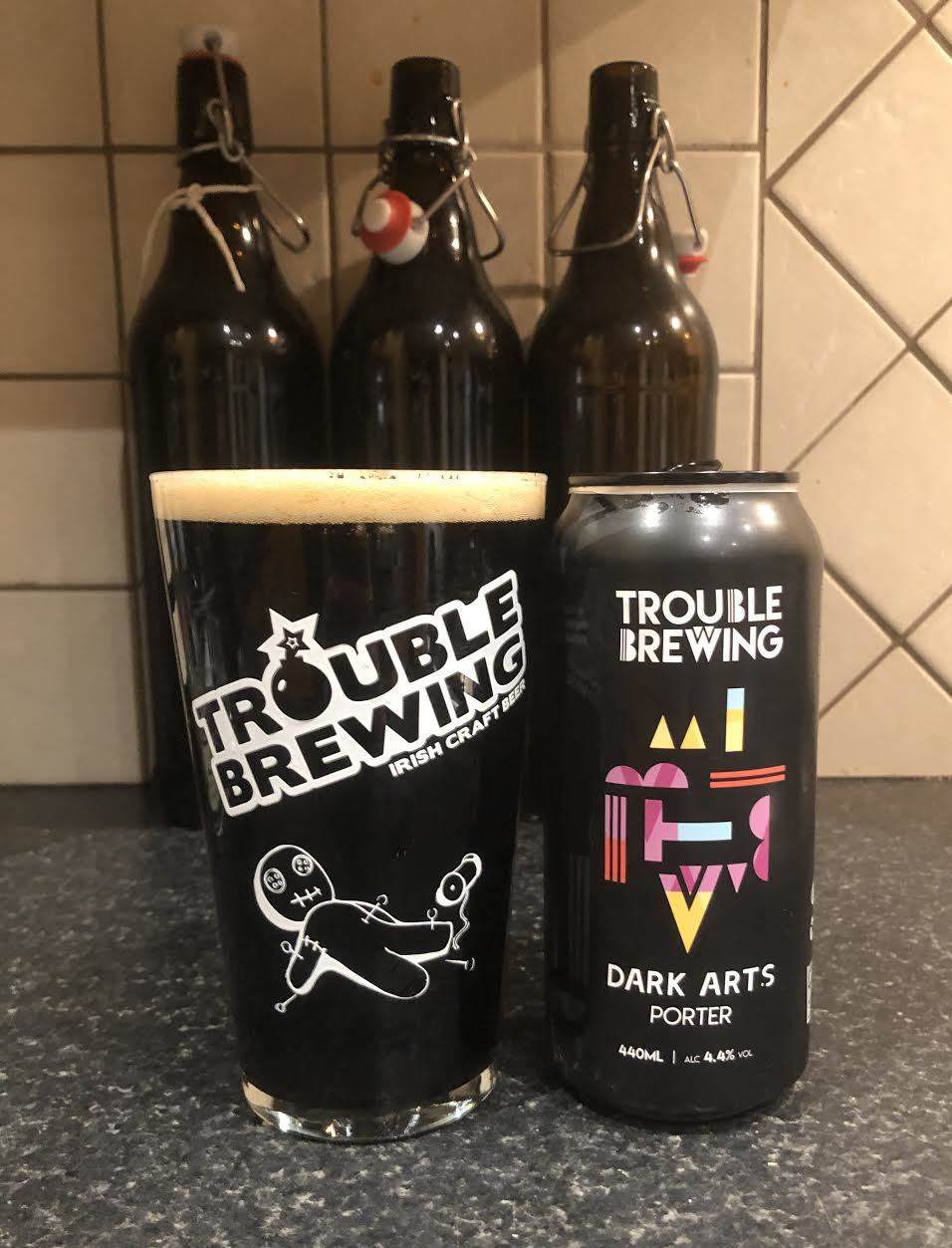
Dark Arts Porter showing characteristic dark body

Porter was first brewed in Ireland in 1776, and although Arthur Guinness did not start brewing porter until 1787, he had phased out all other types of beer from his St. James's Gate Brewery by 1799. Beamish and Crawford and Murphy's Brewery, both in Cork, followed suit and abandoned ales in favour of porter. Roger Protz has argued that the move from porter to stout was made when Arthur Guinness realised that he would pay less tax if he used unmalted and roasted barley in his beer, but brewing historian Martyn Cornell has disputed the historical accuracy of this claim.

In Ireland, especially Dublin, porter was known as "plain porter" or just "plain". This is the drink referred to in Flann O'Brien's poem The Workman's Friend: "A pint of plain is your only man." By contrast, extra-strong porter was called "stout porter". The last Guinness Irish porter was produced in 1974, though the company launched a "revival" based upon a 1796 recipe in 2014.

After the invention of malted barley roasted until black to impart a darker colour and distinct burnt taste to the beer in 1817, Irish brewers dropped the use of brown malt, using patent malt and pale malt only, while English brewers continued using some brown malt, giving a difference in style between English and Irish porters.

Today, porter remains an important style in the burgeoning Irish craft-beer scene. A number of notable Irish craft breweries such as Trouble Brewing in Kildare produce highly regarded interpretations of the style. As with Guinness stout, many porters from Irish craft breweries are carbonated with nitrogen/carbon dioxide blends when served on draught. However, all-carbon dioxide carbonation remains more common for canned and bottled variations.

==== Obadiah Poundage letter ====
Obadiah Poundage was the pen-name of a London brewer of the 18th century who published a letter in the London Chronicle on November 4, 1760, arguing for a rise in the price of beer. The letter was reprinted in various journals, including The Gentleman's Magazine and The Gazetteer, and has since been used by beer historians for the basis of information about porter. Obadiah Poundage was also used as a pen name by the author of a long-running diary column in What's Brewing, the monthly newsletter of the Campaign for Real Ale.

=== 20th and 21st centuries ===
During the First World War, shortages of grain led to restrictions on the strength of beer in Great Britain. Less strict rules were applied in Ireland, allowing Irish brewers such as Guinness to continue to brew beers closer to prewar strengths. English breweries continued to brew a range of bottled, and sometimes draught, stouts until the Second World War and beyond. During the Second World War, because of the Irish Free State's official policy of neutrality, this period was not technically considered wartime, but the country suffered similar resource scarcities and consequent rationing to the United Kingdom, thus this period was officially named the Emergency there. They were considerably weaker than the prewar versions (down from 1.055–1.060 to 1.040–1.042) and around the strength that porter had been in 1914. The drinking of porter, with its strength slot now occupied by single stout, steadily declined, and the last porter was produced in 1941.

Today, porter beers are produced in the Czech Republic, Denmark, Estonia, Finland, Germany, Latvia, Lithuania, Poland, the Russian Federation, Sweden, Ukraine, and the United States. The Anchor Brewing Company started brewing a porter in 1972, and was bottled in 1974 that kickstarted the revival of the style, which began in 1978, when the Penrhos microbrewery introduced a porter. A little later, Timothy Taylor, Yorkshire, began to brew a porter. Now, dozens of breweries in Britain are making porter, with Fuller's London Porter winning gold and silver medals at the 1999, 2000, and 2002 International Beer and Cider Competitions, and CAMRA's Supreme Champion Winter Beer of Britain silver medal in 2007, with Wickwar Brewery's Station Porter winning gold in 2008.

Many breweries brew porters in wide varieties, including pumpkin, honey, vanilla, caramel, plum, and chocolate. Specialised porter brews continue the tradition of ageing in barrels, and the use of bourbon barrels is not uncommon.

==== Baltic region ====
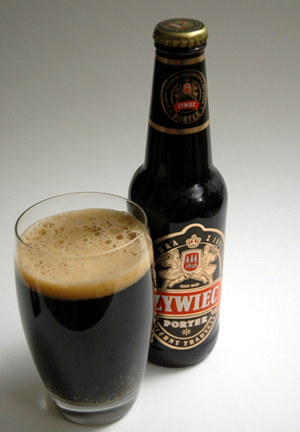
Żywiec Porter, a typical Baltic porter from Poland

Baltic porter is a version of imperial stout that originated in the Baltic region in the 19th century. Imperial stouts exported from Great Britain in the 18th century were popular in the countries around the Baltic Sea, and were recreated locally using local ingredients and brewing traditions. Early versions were warm fermented until the late 19th century, when many breweries began to brew their porters with cool fermentation, so are technically lagers. Baltic porters typically have a minimum gravity of 18° plato and a high alcohol content, even over 10% ABV. Baltic Porter Day, started in Poland in 2016 by Marcin Chmielarz, is celebrated annually on the third Saturday of January.

Baltic porter is a specialty of many Polish breweries, with the country's oldest being produced by Żywiec in 1881. Finland's Sinebrychoff has been brewing Baltic porters in Helsinki since the 1860s, while Waldschlößchen Brewery in Riga was producing a Baltic porter at the turn of the 20th century, which has been continued until today by Aldaris Brewery established in 1937. Estonia's Põhjala is a newcomer specialising in barrel-aged porters. In Denmark, the word "porter" is synonymous with "imperial stout" and Wiibroe's Baltic porter (now brewed by Carlsberg) is known by both names.

==== Germany ====
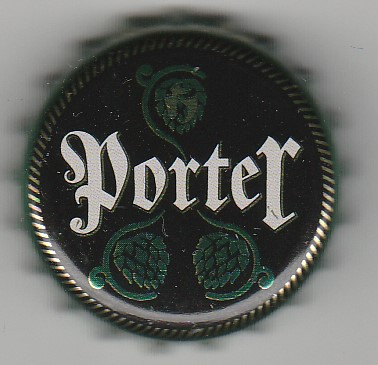
Bottle cap of a Hoepfner porter

Porter was brewed in Germany from 1853 until 1990, when production ceased in Eastern Germany after the reunification. In the German Democratic Republic (GDR), porter was a beer type specified in the industry standard TGL 7764. According to this industry standard, East German porter had an original gravity of 17.7 to 18.3 °P, an apparent attenuation of at least 64%, a carbon dioxide content of at least 0.42%, an isohumulone content of 35 to 50 mg/L (equivalent to 35 to 50 IBU) and could only be sold in bottles.

In terms of adjuncts, East German porter could contain up to 0.45 kg/hl of caramel colouring, as well as up to 100 g/hl of salt. TGL 7764 also prescribed the colour of beer labels: those for East German porter had to use carmine red to indicate the beer type. East German porter was also the only beer in the GDR in which Dekkera bruxellensis could be used for fermentation. Unlike Baltic porter, East German porter was top-fermented, often involving a mixed fermentation with Brettanomyces yeast. Historically, Dekkera/Brettanomyces yeast has been associated with secondary fermentation in porter and stout to give it its typical flavour.

In 1998, the Hoepfner brewery of Karlsruhe resumed production of an old recipe. It was followed by other brewers such as Neuzeller Kloster Brewery and Bergquell Brewery who brew an 8% abv Baltic porter.

==== United States ====
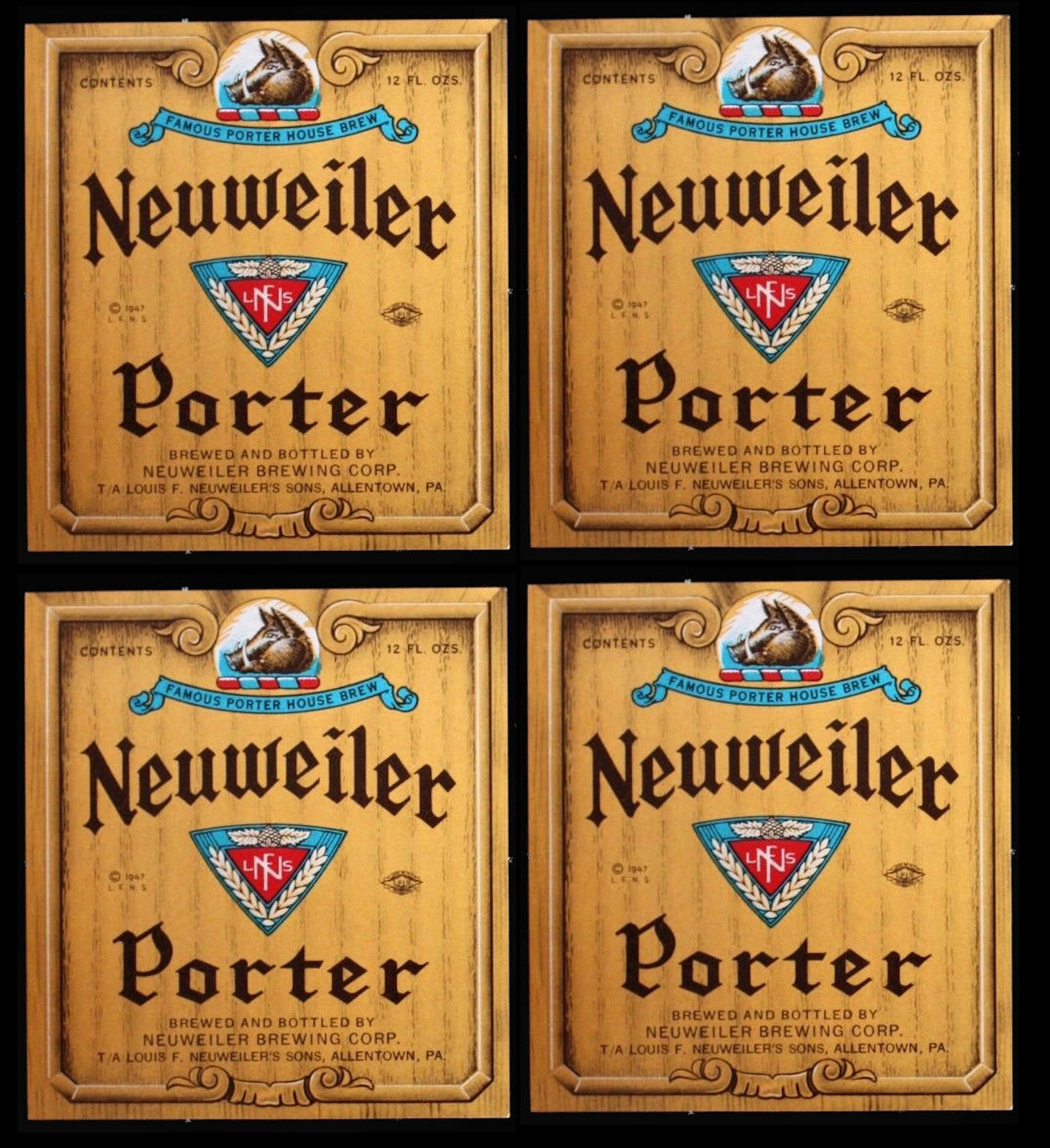
Neuweiler porter labels, Pennsylvania (U.S.), 1960

Porter was being commercially brewed in the United States in the 18th century, especially in New England and Pennsylvania. After the introduction of lagers in the United States in the 1850s, breweries began brewing their porters with lager yeast rather than a top-fermenting one. In addition, these American porters often included adjuncts such as maize, molasses, and Porterine. Porterine was developed in America as a brewer's tool, added in the wort of lighter beers, to add colour and flavour to emulate that of a porter. Porterine is made from the slow cooking of corn syrup, which concentrates the sugars in the substance. With this concentration comes the caramel-like colour and consistency of Porterine. With the advent of the craft brewing movement, many microbreweries produce porters and stouts with traditional methods, as well as the American techniques.
