= Balloon race =

Balloon race may refer to:

- Balloon Race (ride), a type of fairground ride
- A competitive event based on a balloon release
- A competitive event in hot air ballooning
