= Dove (surname) =

The surname Dove has several origins. In some cases the surname is derived from the Middle English dove ("dove"), which is in turn derived from the Old English dūfe ("dove"), or possibly sometimes the Old Norse dúfa ("dove"). In this way, this surname originated as a nickname for a gentle person, or an occupational name for a person who worked with doves. In some cases, the surname Dove originated from the fact that the Middle English word was also used as a masculine and feminine personal name.

The surname Dove is also sometimes an Anglicised form of the Scottish Gaelic MacCalmáin. The surname Dove is also sometimes a variant spelling of the surname Duff (a surname of multiple etymological origins). The surname Dove is also sometimes derived from the Middle Low German dōf, and originated as a nickname for a deaf man.

== People ==
- Arthur Dove (1880–1946), American artist
- Billie Dove (1903–1997), American actress
- Bob Dove (1921–2006), American football player
- Charlie Dove (1879–?), English footballer
- Craig Dove (born 1983), English football midfielder
- Daniel Dove (born 1994), Canadian rapper
- Daphna Dove (born 1975), American rock singer
- Dennis Dove (born 1981), American baseball pitcher
- Dove Gregory (1837–1873), English cricketer
- Ed Dove (born 1937), American football player
- Edmilson Dove (born 1994), Mozambican footballer
- Evelyn Dove (1902–1987), British singer and actress
- Frank Dove (1897–1957), British boxer
- Hamisi Amani-Dove (born 1974), American football (soccer) player
- Heinrich Wilhelm Dove (1803–1879), Prussian physicist, meteorologist
- Horace Dove-Edwin (born 1967), Sierra Leonean sprinter
- J. Maury Dove (1855–1924), American businessman and hotelier
- Jane Thurgood-Dove (1963–1997), Australian murder victim
- Jilson Dove (~1785–1853), American police officer and slave trader
- John Dove (d. 1664/5), an English politician during the Civil War and the Interregnum
- Jonathan Dove (born 1959), British composer of opera, choral works
- Lillian Singleton Dove (c. 1895–1975), African-American physician
- Mabel Dove Danquah (1905–1984), Gold Coast-born journalist, political activist and creative writer
- Marcus Dove (born 1985), American basketball player
- Marmaduke Dove (died c.1866), American politician
- Nah Dove (born 1940s), Ghanaian-British author, lecturer and scholar in African-American studies
- Patricia M. Dove, American mineralogist
- Patrick Edward Dove (1815–1873), Scottish writer
- Rita Dove (born 1952), American poet, author
- Ronnie Dove (born 1935), American country and pop singer
- Toni Dove, American artist
- Ulysses Dove (1947–1996), American choreographer
- Shawn Dove (born 1981), Amateur MMA fighter
