= Balloon release =

Release of gas-filled balloons into the air

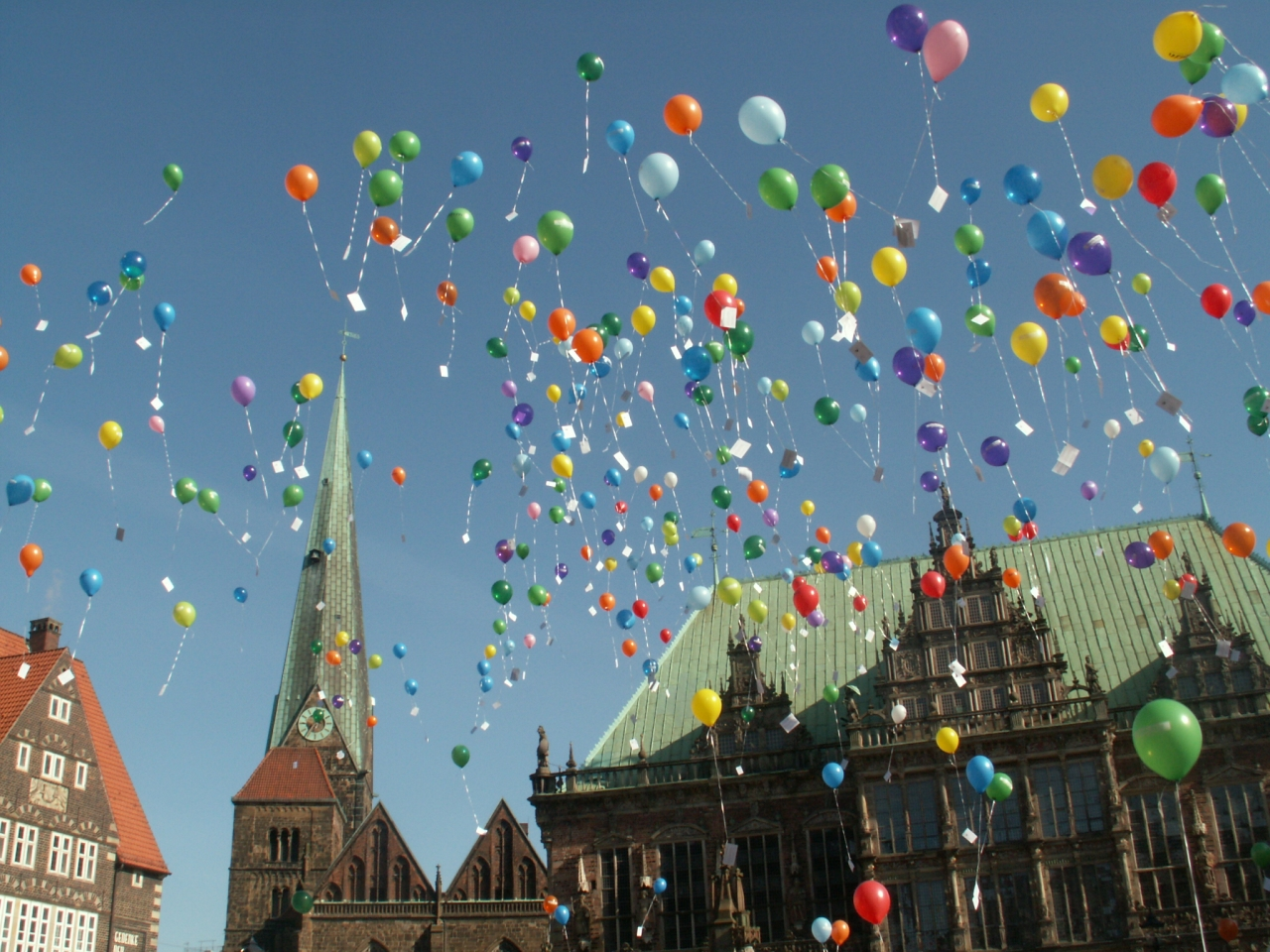
A balloon race that took place in Bremen, Germany, in 2009

A balloon release is a ceremonial event in which a number of hydrogen- or helium-filled balloons are launched into the sky. Balloon releases can be done as a prayer ceremony, to create a photo opportunity, to raise awareness of a cause or campaign, or as a competitive long-distance race.

There is considerable opposition to, and legislation against, balloon releases, due to environmental, flight safety, and wildlife conservation issues.

== Motivations ==
Akin to a sky lantern ceremony of Chinese tradition, a group balloon release can serve as a quiet, prayerful group activity at a funeral or solemn occasion. Unlike sky lanterns, which float down after a short time, helium or hydrogen balloons quickly rise to heights in which they can no longer be seen. Balloon releases are also used in celebration, as a substitute to confetti, in order to avoid an immediate mess.

A balloon race, or balloon flight contest, is a competition wherein the competitors attempt to send balloons as far as possible. It can be compared to a rubber duck race. Postcards are attached to the balloons which are then released. The flight of the balloons cannot be influenced by the competitors. Instead, success in the contest is dependent on the wind conditions and on the location in which the balloon lands. The contest depends on the goodwill of passers-by to find the balloons and return the postcards. A prize may be awarded to the person whose balloon travels the furthest.

== Trajectory ==
Helium balloons are claimed to reach a height of anywhere up to ten kilometres.

It is also possible for a balloon, under the right circumstances, to reach equilibrium, and remain suspended in the air for some time, until the helium slowly diffuses out of the balloon.

A balloon launched from a school in Derby, England in December 2012 was found in Sydney, Australia in March 2013 having travelled 10,545 miles (16,971 km).

== Noted balloon releases ==
- 2011: A farmer from Stalisfield Green near Ashford in Kent, England, successfully claimed compensation, after one of his bullocks choked to death on the string of a balloon released by pupils at Lyndhurst Primary School in Camberwell, south-east London, over 50 miles away, as part of a Comic Relief event.
- 2016: In 2008 Radio City 2—a radio station in Liverpool, England—started annually releasing hundreds of balloons (with messages attached) from the roof of the Radio City 2 "in memory of loved ones that we miss at Christmas time." Despite sustained lobbying by the public in December 2016, DJ Pete Price ignored the pleas and the balloon release went ahead at the end of the programme 'Remember A Loved One At Christmas'. Two leading diving journalists contacted Radio City 2's owner—Bauer Media Group—appealing for this practice to be stopped. Bauer Media confirmed that no company within the Group would conduct a balloon release in the future and a donation would be made to Greenpeace.
- 2017: A three-year-old thoroughbred horse, 'Espoiro', known as 'Feisty', died as a direct result of a helium party balloon landing in her field. Her owner Jennifer Birtwhistle (a leading horse breeder) told Horse & Hound magazine "God isn't sitting in his heaven gathering up all this airborne litter that is sent up with messages attached to it on pieces of string. It doesn't reach anyone, it is entirely self serving."
- 2017: In March 2017 Poundbakery headquarters released 500 orange and black balloons. Each balloon contained a voucher for a 'Go Large' free Poundbakery sandwich. Poundbakery subsequently apologised on 11 April 2017 and donated £1,000 to the British Divers Marine Life Rescue.
- 2018: In February 2018 Quartz Travel announced they would "work with Greenpeace to release 500 biodegradable balloons filled with messages as part of a campaign to reduce plastic pollution at sea." Following mass lobbying by the public Quartz Travel (a British-based travel agent) subsequently cancelled the balloon release on 13 February 2018.
- 2018: In February 2018 EastEnders released balloons during an episode of the soap to mark the death of a character. This occurred three days after the BBC's Director-General announced a three-step plan to remove single-use plastic from operations. "Like millions of people watching Blue Planet II, I was shocked to see the avoidable waste and harm created by single-use plastic. We all need to do our bit to tackle this problem, and I want the BBC to lead the way. Tony Hall, BBC Director-General"
- 2019: On Friday 1 March 2019 an estimated 700 people released balloons in Sunderland, England following the murder of teenager Connor Brown. This mass balloon release was conducted on the same day that the Independent reported that scientists have stated balloons pose the biggest risk of death for seabirds eating plastic.

=== Balloonfest '86 ===
A balloon release in 1986 by the charity United Way Services of Cleveland, in Ohio, USA, was a fund-raising attempt to break the world record for the number of balloons in a single release. One-and-a-half million balloons were released, but an approaching weather front caused them to return to earth, covering the city in balloons, causing car accidents, and hindering a coast guard rescue mission. It resulted in injuries to horses, and caused traffic accidents. A runway at Burke Lakefront Airport had to be closed. The Guinness Book of Records no longer accepts balloon release records. While it is commonly stated that the event resulted in the death of two fisherman, this is false and was never found to be conclusive.

== Industry code of conduct ==
=== The Balloon Council ===
The Balloon Council, an organization of balloon retailers, balloon distributors, and balloon manufacturers, has publicly come out against the practice of releasing balloons. Included in their list of "Smart Balloon Practices" is the message that balloons are "Worth the Weight," meaning that all balloons should be tied to a weight and not released outdoors. The campaign to end the release of balloons includes the hashtag #BeBalloonSmart and a cartoon character named Faraday, named after Michael Faraday, the inventor of the rubber balloon.

=== United Kingdom ===
In the United Kingdom, the National Association of Balloon Artists and Suppliers (NABAS) provide guidelines for appropriate balloon releases in order to minimize potential environmental impacts. These guidelines include the limit to the number of balloons that should be released, releasing only balloons made from appropriate material, and that no materials such as ribbons or strings are included or attached to the end of any balloons that are released.

== Opposition ==
=== Environmental ===
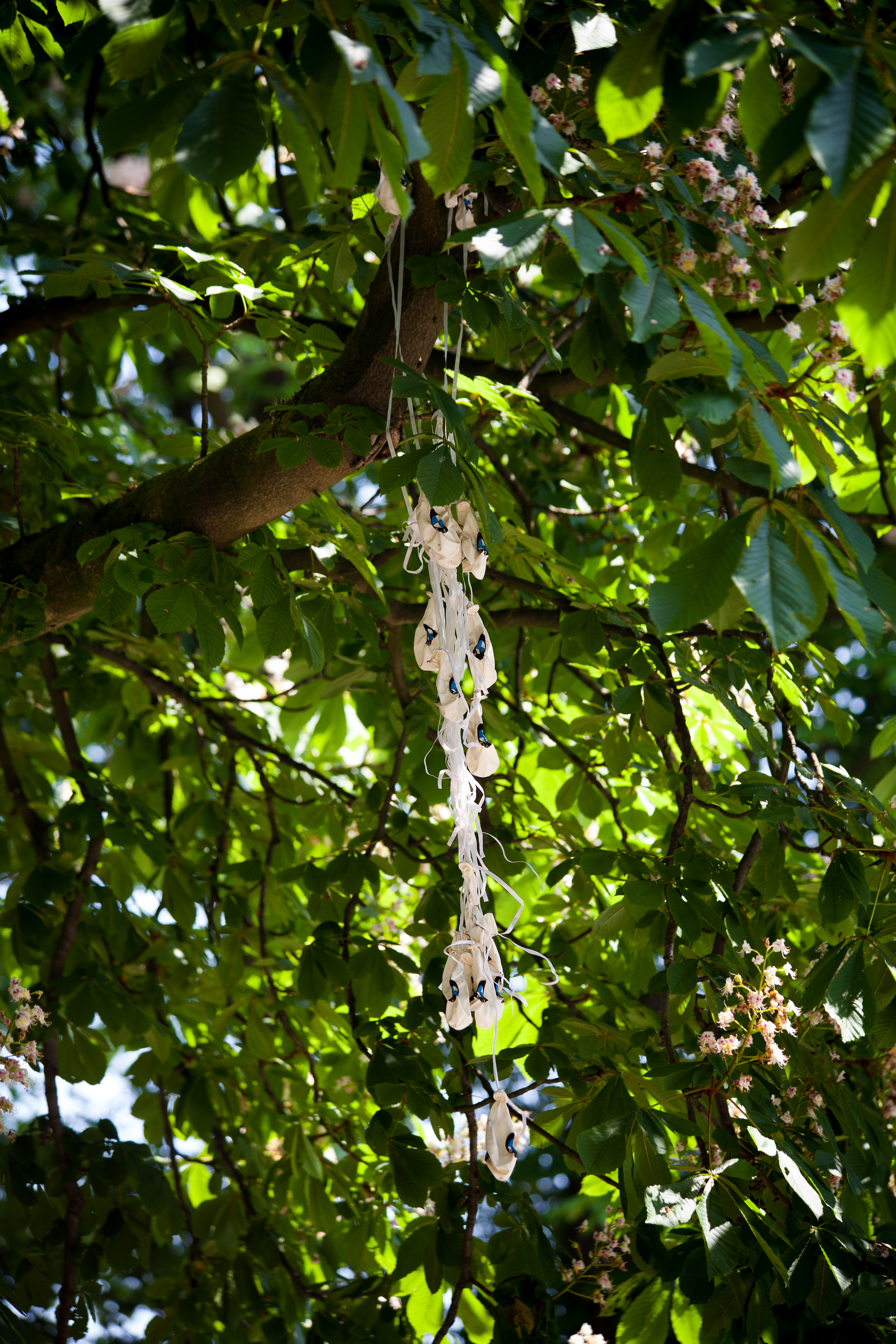
Balloon remains in the branches of a chestnut tree

A number of organisations (for example, in the United Kingdom, these include the Marine Conservation Society, the Royal Society for the Prevention of Cruelty to Animals, the Tidy Britain Group, the National Farmers' Union and the RSPB) oppose balloon releases, because of the visual impact of the fallen, deflated balloons, and the risk of harm to wildlife and domestic animals which they pose. For these reasons, balloon releases are prohibited in some jurisdictions.

In May 2018 a peer-reviewed study by Delia M. Webb was published that revealed 2,223 pieces of balloon litter were found on 39 beaches across Cornwall between July and December 2016. The study entitled "Just a balloon? A local study of the extent and impacts of balloon litter on beaches" reported that some of the balloons found on Cornish beaches had travelled from other parts of the UK, Ireland and Europe.

=== Flight safety ===
Within many countries written permission is often required from the relevant airspace regulatory authority. In the UK this would be the Civil Aviation Authority, for releases over a certain number of balloons.

=== Overhead power lines ===
On 9 February 2018 rush-hour trains near Billericay, Essex were disrupted for more than two hours because 50 yellow and black balloons were tangled on overhead lines.

=== Helium scarcity ===
Helium is a natural atmospheric gas, but as a land-resource, it is limited. As of 2012 the United States National Helium Reserve accounted for 30 percent of the world's helium, and was expected to run out of helium in 2018. Some geophysicists fear the world's helium could be gone in a generation. For this reason, balloon releases are seen as a wasteful use of this limited resource.

=== Films ===
The documentary Rubber Jellyfish (2018) talks about and criticizes the actions of balloon releasing and how it contributes to pollution and animal death.

== Virtual balloon race ==
As an alternative to a physical balloon race, a virtual balloon race involves imaginary balloons which are "launched" at a set date and place and allowed to "fly" for a set period such as a week, their route being calculated by a computer programme according to weather data. Charities can use this as a fund-raiser by allowing supporters to buy balloons and compete in the "race", with no harm done to wildlife or the planet. As no physical contact is involved this fund-raising method was useful for charities during the lockdown of the 2020 COVID-19 pandemic when many other fund-raising events had to be cancelled. British marketing company Purepages, based in Bolton, has developed "the world's first 100% eco-friendly virtual balloon race platform", with software which allows purchasers to adjust the properties of their balloon to influence its prospects.

== See also ==
- Release dove
- 21-gun salute
- Sky lantern (also known as Chinese lantern)
