= Tolbert Lanston =

American inventor

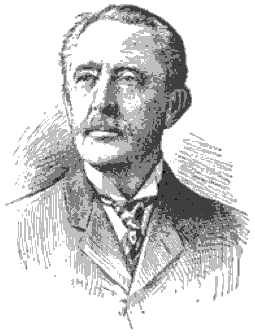
- Born: February 3, 1844; Troy, Ohio, U.S.
- Died: February 18, 1913 (aged 69); Washington, D.C., U.S.
- Resting place: Oak Hill Cemetery; Washington, D.C., U.S.
- Occupation: Inventor
- Spouse: Betty G. Herdel (m. 1866)
- Children: 1
- Awards: Elliott Cresson Medal (1896)

Tolbert Lanston (February 3, 1844 – February 18, 1913) was the American founder of Monotype, inventing a mechanical typesetting system patented in 1887 and the first hot metal typesetter a few years later.

== Life ==
Tolbert Lanston was born into a poor family in Troy, Ohio. He quit school at the age of 15, he was a volunteer in the Federal Army during the Civil War. His last rank was sergeant.

After 1865 he worked at the Pension-Department of the American Government. He worked with Seaton and Herman Hollerith (founder of IBM) on tabulating devices and invented an adding machine which was the first money-maker for Hollerith's company. Lanston's brother was a printer and evidently that connection caused his interest in automating the laborious task of hand-setting every letter in any or all texts. He resigned his post at the Pension office and devoted the remainder of his life to perfection of his machine. He created the idea but others perfected it and made the Lanston Monotype Machine Company successful. That includes J. Maury Dove, a coal merchant who became president of the company and remained there until his death in 1923, and John Sellers Bancroft, who was the mechanical genius behind the Monotype machine. The story is thoroughly developed in Tolbert Lanston and the Monotype: The Origin of Digital Typesetting.

He married Betty G. Herdel in 1866, and they had one son.

In 1896, he received the Elliott Cresson Medal for his invention.

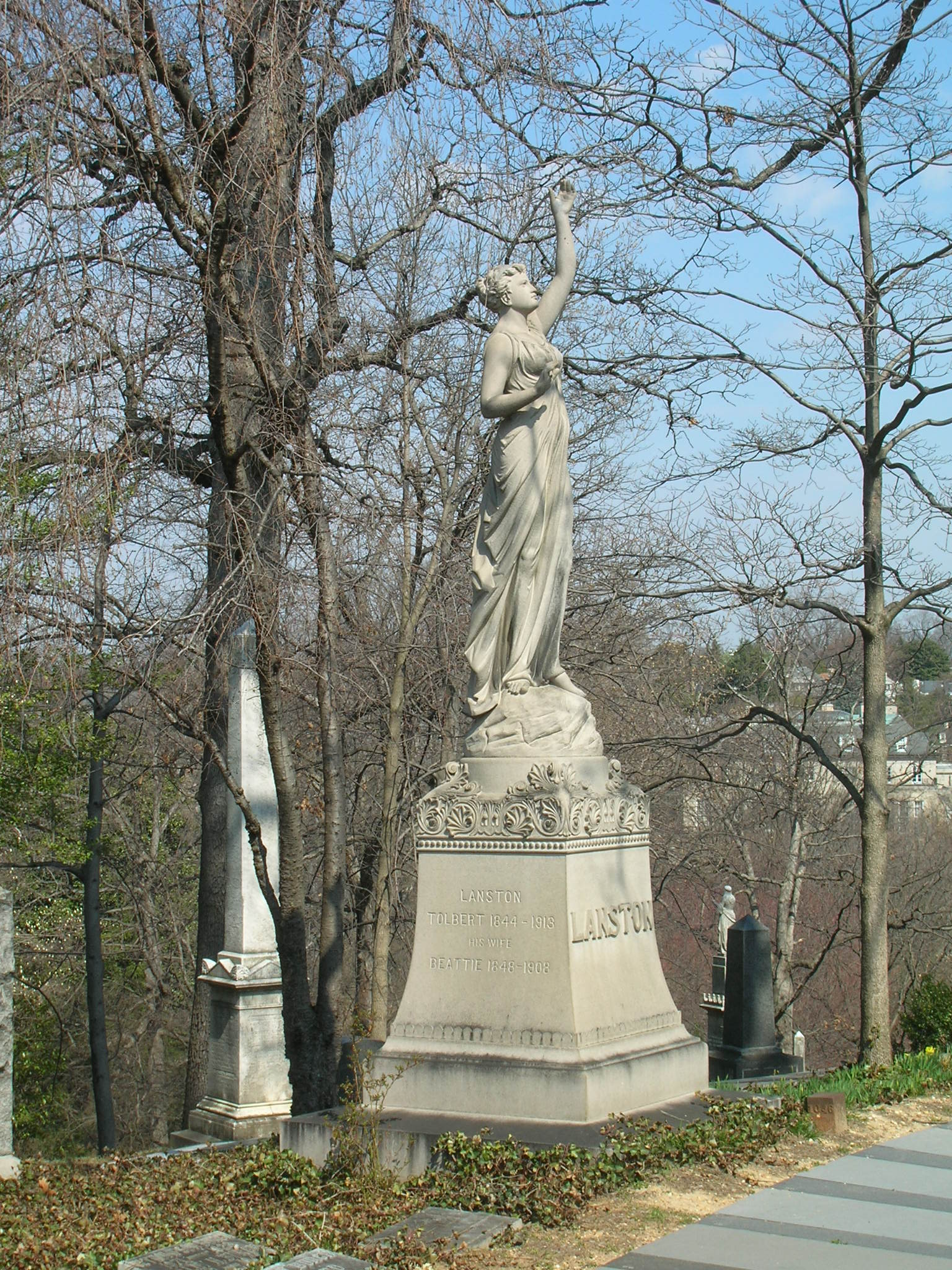
Grave of Lanston at Oak Hill Cemetery

He died in Washington, D.C., on February 18, 1913. He was buried at Oak Hill Cemetery in Washington, D.C.

== The inventor ==
Although Lanston was an inventor, he had no education at all as an engineer.

He did start his inventions to create a type-setting machine, first with the financial help of Seaton, later from J. Maury Dove, coal-merchant in Washington.

Letters sent to the Patent-bureau with specifications sent at:

- September 30, 1885, July 3, 1886
- patent nr. 364.521 June 7, 1887
- patent nr. 364.525 June 7, 1887

The idea was to make lead type for printing, with two machines, the first to produce two paper-tapes, these two paper-tapes controlling the second machine to produce the type. Lanston made a series of prototypes.

== Development of the machine ==
John Sellers Bancroft of Sellers & Co in Philadelphia was asked to help with the development of the machine.

Bancroft made a series of important improvements. A wedge to govern the width of the character. This wedge makes the same movement as the diecase with the matrices, in one direction. The matrices are ordered in the diecase, each row has only matrices for characters of the same width. The wedge controls the opening in the mould.

Compressed air was used to control the movements of the matrices above the mould of the machine.

This machine was capable to produce filled lines, by controlling the width of the spaces, with two extra wedges. The accuracy of the machine was 2,000 parts in 1 inch.

The first commercial machines were available around 1897. These machines had only room for 132 matrices. A few of these machines were sent to England.

Later types had die-cases with 15*15 and 17*15 or even 16*17 matrices.
