= Sayers (bakery) =

Largest independent retail baker in the north-west of England

Coordinates: 53°34′10.7″N 2°25′31.3″W

- Industry: Food (bakery group)
- Founded: 1912
- Headquarters: Bolton, United Kingdom
- Number of locations: 158
- Products: Sandwiches, pies and pastries, baked goods
- Number of employees: 1,400
- Website: sayersthebakers.co.uk

Sayers the Bakers is the largest independent retail baker in the North West of England, established in 1912 in Liverpool. The retailer sells savouries, sandwiches and bakery products across over 150 stores, from Fleetwood in Lancashire down to Wrexham in Wales. Sayers remained a family run business until 1977 when it was sold to United Biscuits, and then again to Warburtons in 1990. In 2019, it went into administration but was bought by a new company, Sayers and Poundbakery.

== History ==
Previous logo

Sayers was established in 1912 by Fred and Lylian Sayer. Their first kitchen was based in a basement in Prescot Road, Old Swan, Liverpool and this then moved to a second shop in County Road, Walton in 1922. A larger bakery opened on Aintree Road in Bootle, in 1925. Then in 1931, a further expansion moved the business to a larger location in Lorenzo Drive, Norris Green.

Sayers then remained a family business until 1977, when it was sold to United Biscuits. It was sold again to Warburtons in July 1990, a baking firm based in Bolton. Warburtons also bought Hampsons, Sayers' sister company and other bakeries in their estate included Burneys of Rochdale, Spinks of Sharston, Parkers of Eccles, Burtons of Blackpool.

In 1996, Warburtons sold all its bakers stores to Lyndale Foods. The following year, the brand was expanded through the acquisition of Anne's Shops from Roberts Bakery.

In 2006, 183 jobs were lost at the site in Norris Green, Liverpool, with a further 200 going in 2007. The parent company of Sayers, the Lyndale Group, went into administration on 9 June 2008 and the Norris Green site was closed immediately. Sayers itself entered administration in December 2019 and was bought by Karen Wood, forming a new company, Sayers and Poundbakery Limited.

== Future ==
Sayers is currently the biggest independent retail baker in the north west and North Wales, with more than 150 shops and 25 cafés from Fleetwood in the north to Wrexham in the south, and Rhyl in the west to Halifax in the east.

Some of its shops have now changed to a sister brand, Poundbakery, which sells similar products but at a lower price.

== Products ==
Sayers sells a range of cakes, savouries, sandwiches, soups and bakery products.

Sayers also manufactures frozen foods under the Sayers brand which is sold in stores such as Home Bargains and Lidl (in England) as of May 2025.
