= Hawk and dove (disambiguation) =

Hawk and dove may refer to:

- Hawks & Doves, a 1980 album by Neil Young
- Hawk and Dove, a fictional superhero team that appears in DC Comics
- War hawk, an advocate for controversial wars
- Monetary hawk and dove
- Hawk-Dove game, a game theoretical model of aggressive behavior
- The Hawk and the Dove, a book by Nicholas Thompson
