= Dove (given name) =

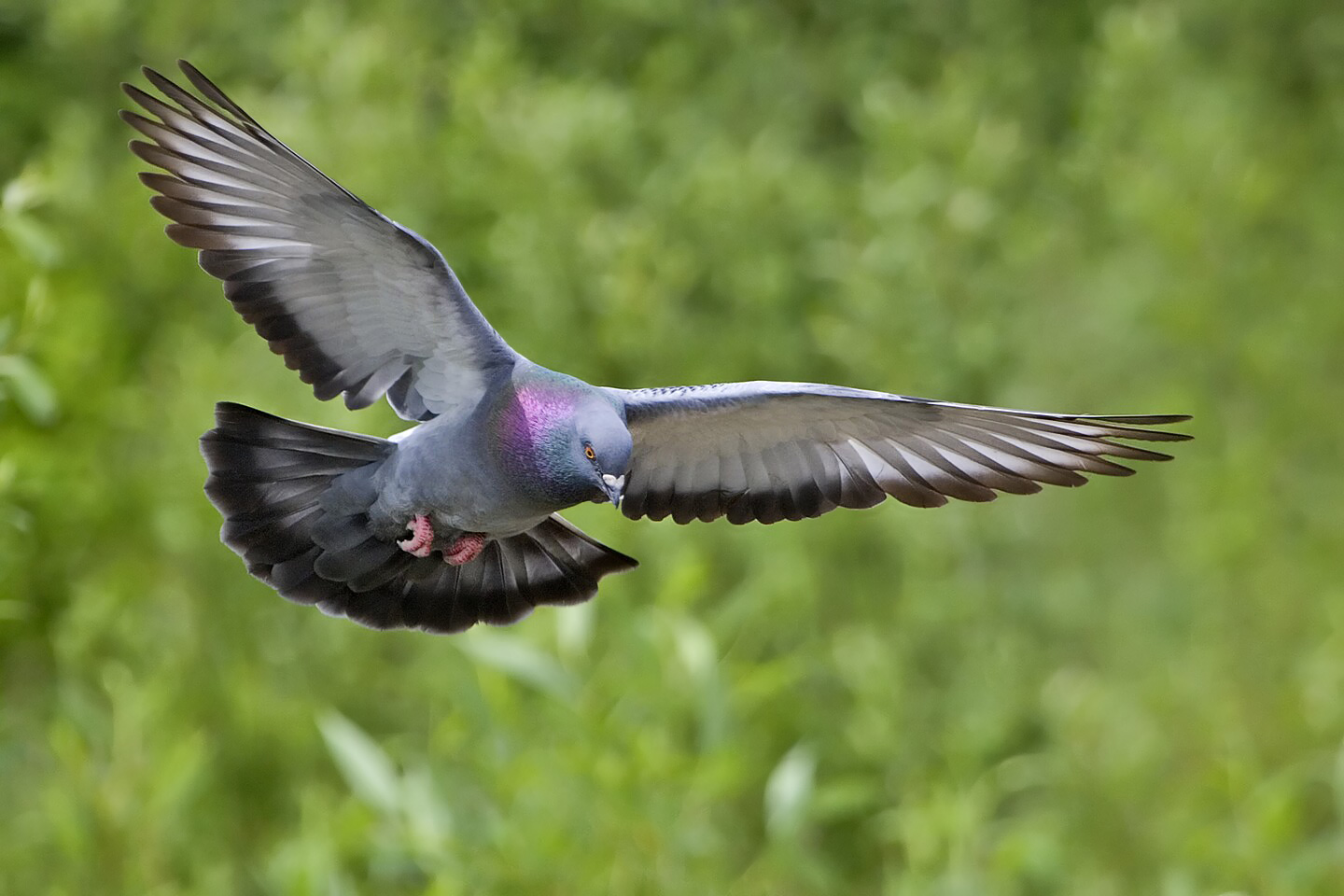
- Columba livia, known in English as Rock dove and Rock pigeon
- Pronunciation: /ˈdʌv/
- Gender: Feminine and Masculine
- Language: English

Origin
- Language: English
- Origin: dove

Dove /ˈdʌv/ is a given name in the English language. The name is derived from the English vocabulary word "dove". This word is in turn derived from the Old English dūfe, from the Proto-Germanic dūbǭ. The dove is noted as a symbol of peace. The name was coined in modern times.

== Women with the name ==
- Dove Bradshaw (born 1949), American artist
- Dove Cameron, born Chloe Hosterman (born 1996), American actress and singer
- Dove Kull, born Alice Montgomery (1897–1991), American social worker
- Dove Mulkey (1891–1972), American legislator

== Men with the name ==
- Dove Attia (born 1957), Tunisian-born French musical producer and television personality
- Dove Gregory, born Gregory Dove (1837–1873), English cricketer
- Dove-Myer Robinson, born Mayer Dove Robinson (1901–1989), New Zealand mayor
