= J. Maury Dove =

American businessman and hotelier (1855–1924)

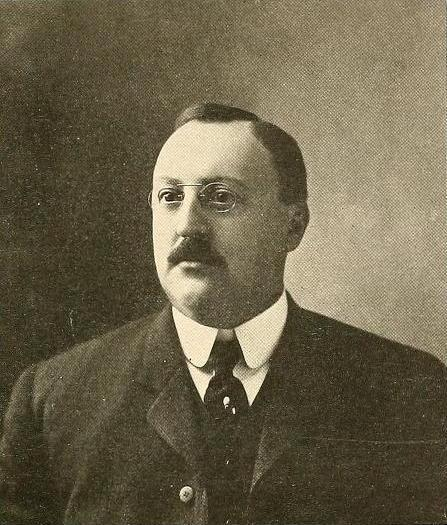
- Dove in a 1903 publication
- Born: October 28, 1855; Washington, D.C., U.S.
- Died: June 26, 1924 (aged 68); Washington, D.C., U.S.
- Resting place: Rock Creek Cemetery
- Education: St. John's College
- Occupations: Business executive; hotelier
- Spouse: Nannie Carter (m. 1882)
- Children: 4

J. Maury Dove (October 28, 1855 – June 26, 1924) was an American coal merchant, business executive and hotelier from Washington, D.C. He served as president of J. Maury Dove Company and the Lanston Monotype Machine Company. He owned the Shoreham Hotel and was part owner of Raleigh Hotel and Willard Hotel.

== Early life ==
J. Maury Dove was born on October 28, 1855, in Washington, D.C., to Anne W. (née Parker) and William Thomas Dove. At a young age, his family moved to Rockville, Maryland. He studied at Rockville Academy. He then studied at St. John's College.

== Career ==
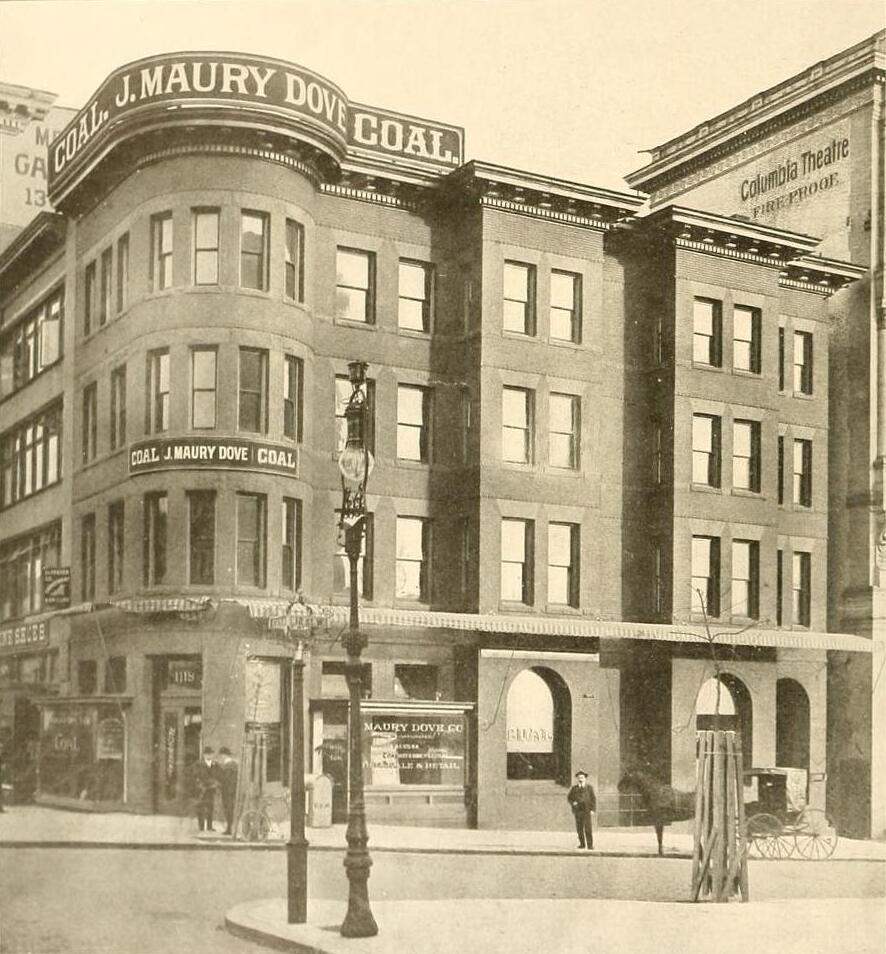
J. Maury Dove Coal Company on 12th and F Street NW, Washington, D.C.

Dove first worked for a book concern in Philadelphia. In 1876, he was a clerk in Solomon Stover's coal company on 21st street and I street. In May 1880, following Stover's death, he partnered with William J. Wilson and bought out Stover's stake in the company. Dove bought out Wilson's stake on April 1, 1882. He continued the company as J. Maury Dove Company. On September 2, 1902, he incorporated the company. Randall H. Hagner joined the company following its merger with Hagner & Merriam.

Dove succeeded Tolbert Lanston as president of the Lanston Monotype Machine Company in 1892. Under his leadership, he encouraged improvements to future Monotype machines that would also fit all previous models. He was also director of the Lanston Monotype Corporation of England. With the Lanston Company, he worked in Philadelphia and New York City. In 1912, he purchased from Levi P. Morton the Shoreham Hotel. He was president and owner of the hotel. He was organizer and part owner of the Raleigh Hotel and the Willard Hotel.

== Personal life ==
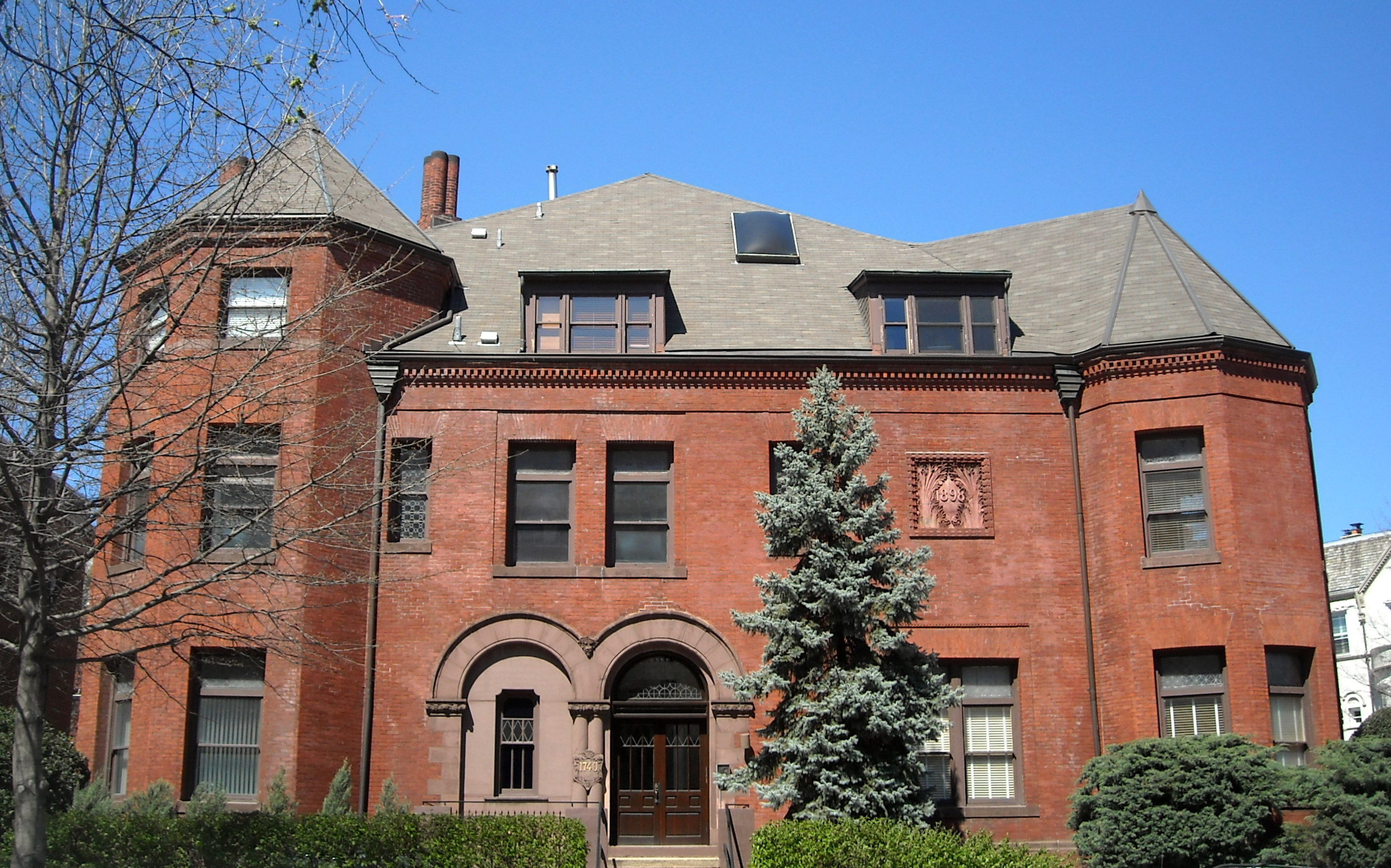
J. Maury Dove House, New Hampshire Avenue, Washington, D.C.

Dove married Nannie Carter of Maryland in 1882. They had a daughter and three sons, Mary Carter, J. Maury Jr., Robert Carter and Edward Stellwagen. He was a communicant of St. Paul's Catholic Church on V and 15th St NW in Washington, D.C.

Dove was one of three that organized the Blue Ridge Rod and Gun Club at Harpers Ferry. He was president of the Columbia Athletic Club. He was also a member of the Congressional Club and the Lawyers' Club in New York.

Dove died on June 26, 1924, at his home on New Hampshire Avenue in Washington, D.C. He was buried in Rock Creek Cemetery.
