= Dove (crater) =

Lunar impact crater

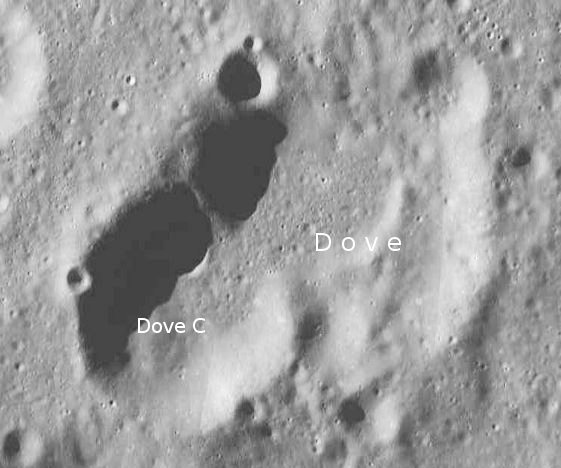
- LRO global mosaic image
- Coordinates: 46.7°S 31.5°E
- Diameter: 30.36 km (18.86 mi)
- Depth: 1.6 km (0.99 mi)
- Colongitude: 329° at sunrise
- Eponym: Heinrich W. Dove

Dove is a lunar impact crater located in the rugged lunar highlands in the southeastern part of the Moon. It lies to the north of the prominent crater Pitiscus.

It is a heavily eroded crater with a rim that is overlaid by multiple smaller craters. In particular, the satellite crater Dove C has broken into the southwestern rim, and a gap joins the floor of the two formations. The southern rim has been struck by multiple small impacts that form a tight cluster across the rim. There are also several small craters along the northern rim. A crater-like formation with a level floor covers nearly half the interior floor to the northwest.

This formation is named after German physicist Heinrich Wilhelm Dove (1803-1879). His name was incorporated into the lunar nomenclature of German astronomer Johann F. J. Schmidt in 1878. Its designation was formally adopted by the International Astronomical Union in 1935.

== Satellite craters ==
By convention these features are identified on lunar maps by placing the letter on the side of the crater midpoint that is closest to Dove.

Dove	Latitude	Longitude	Diameter
A	46.9° S	33.5° E	13 km
B	47.1° S	33.1° E	19 km
C	47.0° S	30.8° E	19 km
Z	44.5° S	29.2° E	8 km
