= The Dove, Hammersmith =

Listed pub in London, England

The Dove
- The pub in 2016

General information
- Type: Public house
- Location: 19 Upper Mall, Hammersmith, London, England
- Coordinates: 51°29′26″N 0°14′05″W
- Year built: Early to mid-18th century
- Renovated: 1948
- Owner: Fuller, Smith & Turner

Design and construction
- Designations

Listed Building – Grade II
- Official name: The Dove Inn public house with wall to south east
- Designated: 17 June 1954
- Reference no.: 1079783

Website
- dovehammersmith.co.uk

The Dove is a Grade II listed public house on Upper Mall in Hammersmith, London, England. Dating from the early to mid-18th century, it is associated with a number of literary and cultural figures. In the late 19th century, T. J. Cobden-Sanderson named the Doves Bindery and later the Doves Press after the pub. The building is noted for its historic interior, which is included on CAMRA's National Inventory of Historic Pub Interiors, and for its 33-square-foot (3.1 m^{2}) front bar, listed in the Guinness Book of Records as the smallest public bar in the United Kingdom.

== History ==
The public house dates from the early to mid-18th century, with later alterations and additions. James Thompson is said to have written the words for the 1740 song Rule, Britannia! there.

In the late 19th century, T. J. Cobden-Sanderson named the Doves Bindery, and subsequently the Doves Press, after the pub.

A number of historical figures have been associated with the pub beside the River Thames, including William Morris, who lived next door, and later Graham Greene, Ernest Hemingway and Dylan Thomas. The pub appears in the 1930 A. P. Herbert novel The Water Gipsies, loosely disguised as the fictitious The Pigeons.

On 17 June 1954, the Dove Inn was designated a Grade II listed building. The pub's front bar, at 33 square feet (3.1 m^{2}), is listed in the Guinness Book of Records as the smallest public bar in the United Kingdom. The pub featured in the 1963 promotional film Song of London which showed its name sign at the rear that, at the time, wrongly said The Doves.

The pub is regarded by the Campaign for Real Ale (CAMRA) as having an interior of "outstanding national historic importance" and is rated three stars on its National Inventory of Historic Pub Interiors. As of July 2026 the freehold was owned by Fuller, Smith & Turner.

== Architecture ==
=== Exterior ===
The building is constructed of brick and has an early 19th-century front elevation facing the street. This frontage has two storeys and is two windows wide, with shutters on the ground-floor windows and a covered entrance supported by brackets. Exposed roof timbers can be seen beneath the eaves. On the river side, part of the ground floor projects outward and supports a timber-railed balcony above, while a section of historic walling survives to one side.

=== Interior ===
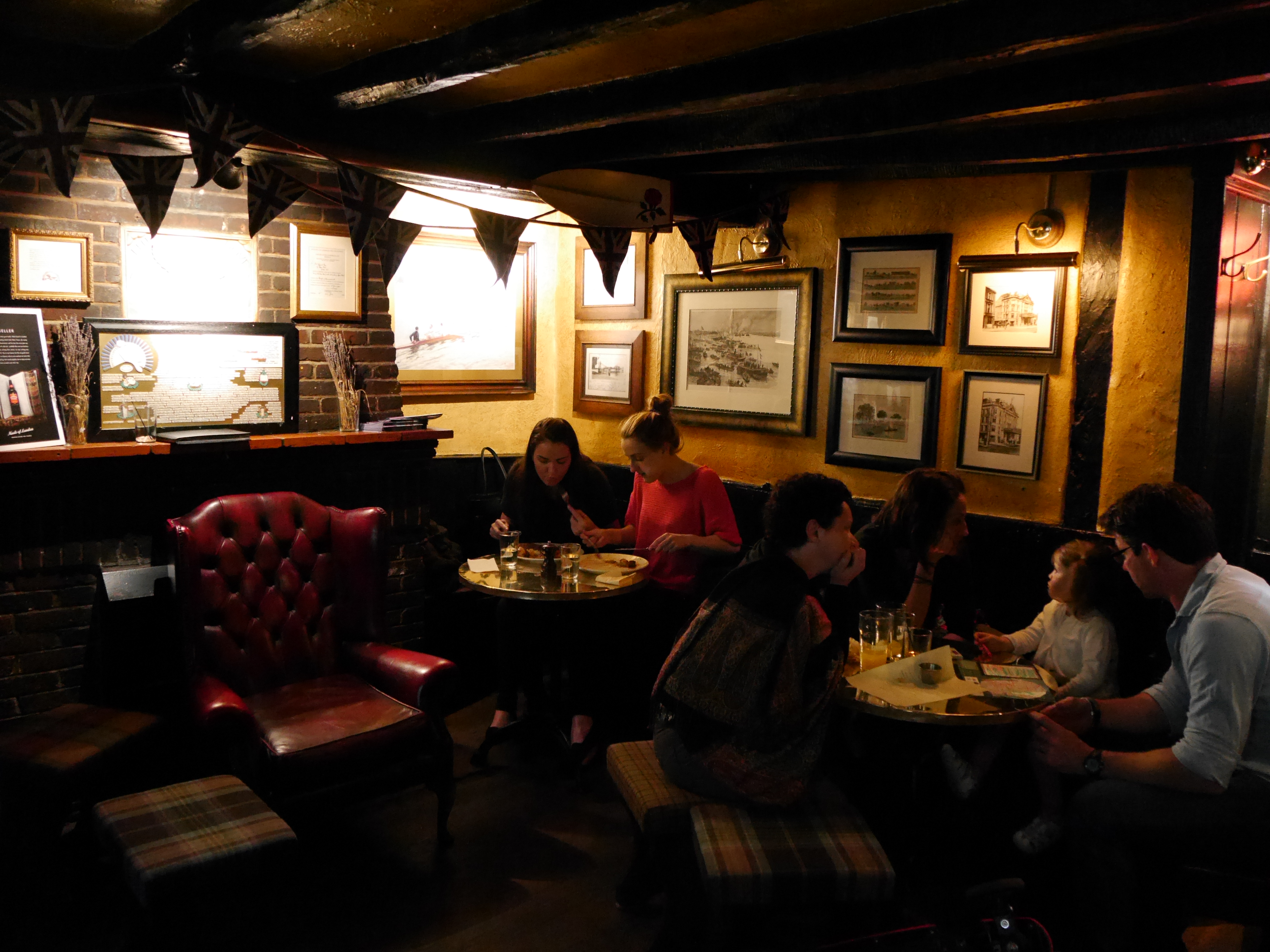
The interior in 2014

The pub is particularly noted for its very small snug. Research by beer writer Martyn Cornell has suggested that this room may have been added after 1911 rather than forming part of the original building. A brass plaque records a major flood that reached the pub in January 1928.

The front rooms retain historic features including fixed seating, a traditional bar counter and timber panelling. Some of the woodwork may date from the 18th century and could represent some of the earliest surviving purpose-made pub fittings. Repairs carried out in 1948 included the installation of a large fireplace decorated with a carving of a dove carrying an olive branch. A modern rear room opens onto a riverside terrace overlooking the Thames.

== See also ==
- List of pubs in London
