= Dove release =

Dove bred for release at an event

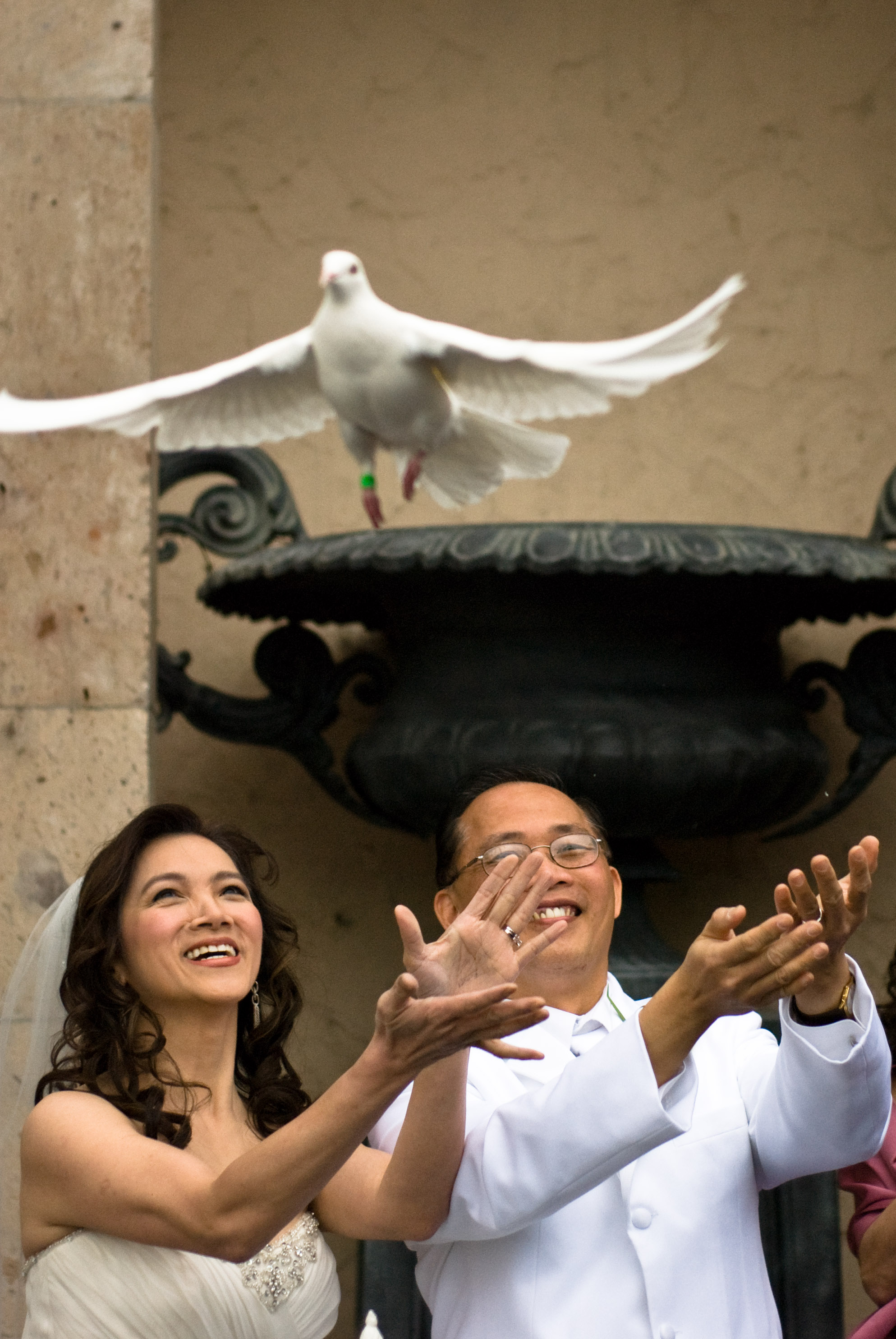
A white dove being released at a wedding

A release dove is usually a small white domestic pigeon used in a dove release for events such as public ceremonies, weddings and funerals. They typically have a symbolic meaning for the event.

== Subspecies and types ==
Typically, one or more white doves are released. Usually, domestic pigeons bred for small size and white coloration are released due to their homing ability.

Barbary doves (Streptopelia risoria), also known as ringneck doves, carry a mutation that makes them completely white. These white Barbary doves are most commonly used in stage magic acts. White Barbary doves are sometimes released in large public ceremonies as a peace symbol, and at weddings and funerals. However, releases usually use homing pigeons, as Barbary doves lack the homing instinct and will die if released into the wild. Albinism or other genetic anomalies that produce an entirely white dove occur very rarely in the wild since an all-white coloration would make these birds stand out in their natural habitats, leaving them highly vulnerable to predators.

== Ethics ==
Pigeon breeds used for dove release services are chosen for their color and small size, not for their homing abilities or flight speed. Although dove release businesses advertise that their birds will be able to safely return home, released doves are frequently killed in accidents or by predators before they can return home. Trained white homing pigeons, domesticated forms of the rock dove, stand a better chance of returning home if vigorously trained prior to release by a trainer and within a distance of 600 miles from the loft. Ringneck doves that are released into the wild and survive will likely starve to death.

Increased public awareness about animal cruelty, and the influx of injured or lost release doves in animal shelters is decreasing the demand for release dove services.

== Symbolic use ==
=== Theological ===
The release of doves is associated with the Genesis flood narrative. In the narrative, a dove is sent out three times as the flood waters are receding.

=== Olympic Games ===
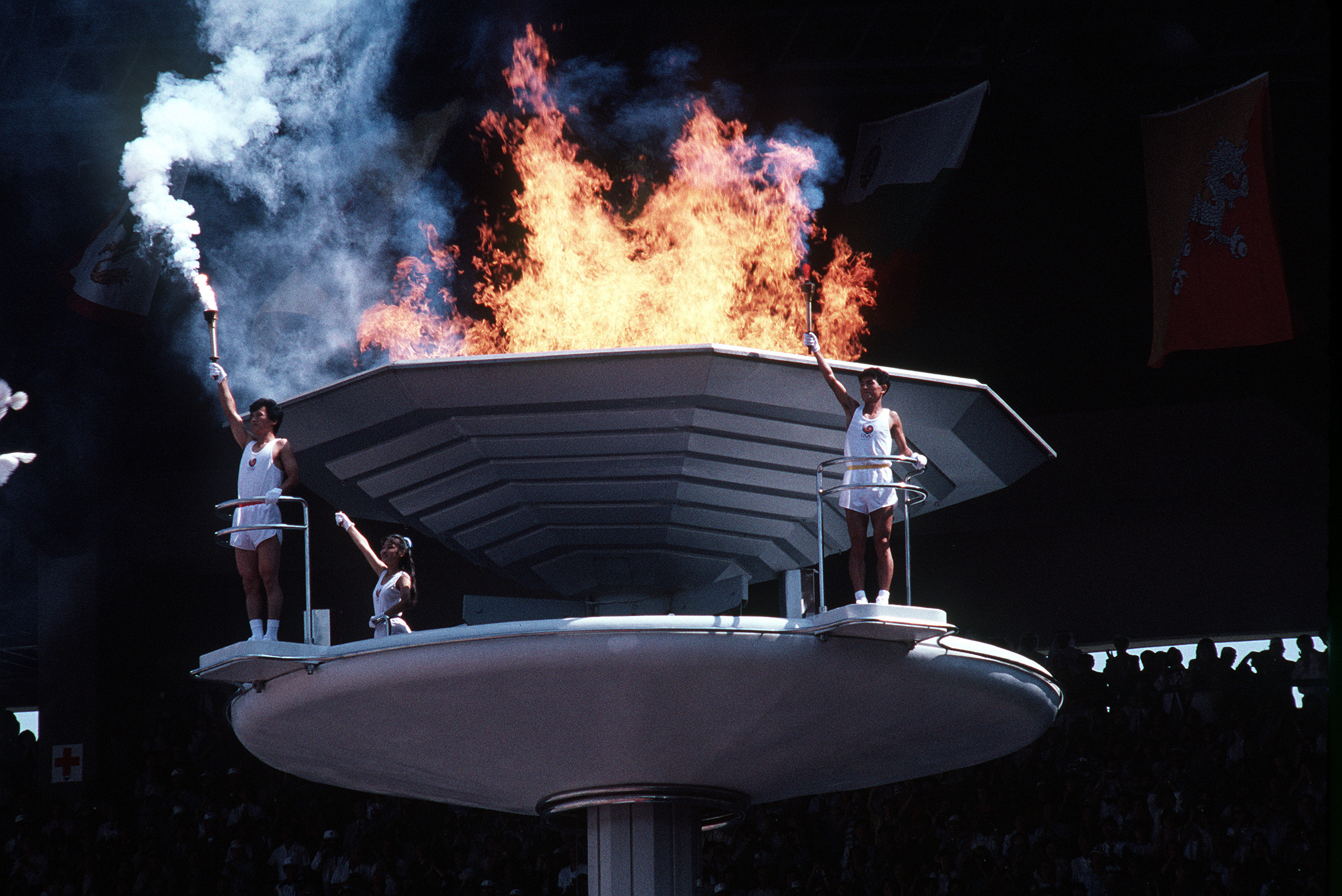
The ritual of releasing doves at the Olympic Games was halted after several birds were killed by the torch at the 1988 Summer Olympics opening ceremony.

The ritual of releasing doves in the Olympic Games originated in 1896. The doves in the 1896 Summer Olympics were released as part of the closing ceremony; the ritual became an official part of the opening ceremony in the 1920 Summer Olympics in Antwerp. The ritual was altered to be purely symbolic after the 1988 Summer Olympics in Seoul when several of the doves released landed on the Olympic torch and were burnt alive when it was lit. At the Olympics 2021, in Tokyo, a thousand paper doves were used instead of real birds.

=== Vatican City ===
In 2004, Pope John Paul II released doves, with children, to promote Christian unity and world peace. In 2005, this became an annual tradition. On multiple occasions, the pigeons did not fly away but rather returned to the window from which they were released. At some releases the doves were attacked by other birds, such as a seagull in 2013 and a seagull and a crow in 2014. In December 2013, at an event where Pope Benedict XVI released doves during a Holocaust remembrance event the birds were attacked by a seagull.

Since 2015, the Vatican City no longer engages in the releasing doves due to the problems of birds not flying away and being attacked by other birds. The notoriety of this event generated a public outcry for the Vatican to halt this practice. A balloon release has since been used instead.

== See also ==
- Balloon release
- Sky lantern
