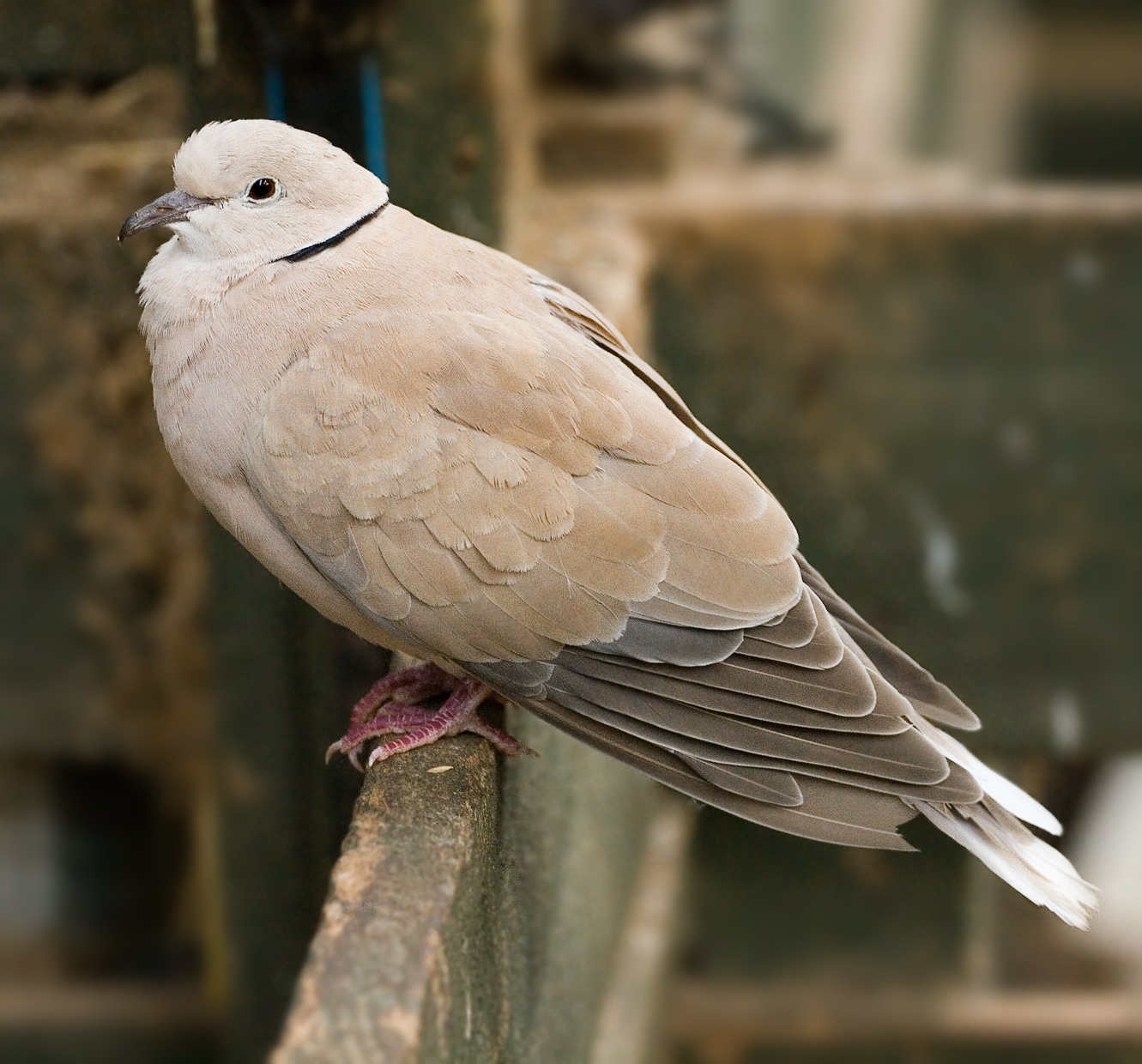

Conservation status
- Domesticated

Scientific classification (disputed)
- Kingdom: Animalia
- Phylum: Chordata
- Class: Aves
- Order: Columbiformes
- Family: Columbidae
- Genus: Streptopelia
- Species: S. risoria

Binomial name
- Streptopelia risoria (Linnaeus, 1758)

Synonyms
- Columba risoria Linnaeus, 1758

Audio

= Barbary dove =

Species of bird

The Barbary dove, ringed turtle dove, ringneck dove, ring-necked turtle dove, or ring dove (Streptopelia risoria) is a domestic member of the dove and pigeon family (Columbidae).

== Taxonomy and domestication ==
The Barbary dove was formally described in 1758 by the Swedish naturalist Carl Linnaeus in the tenth edition of his Systema Naturae. He placed it with the doves and pigeons in the genus Columba and coined the binomial name Columba risoria. Linnaeus specified the type locality as India. The specific epithet risoria is Latin meaning "laughing". The Barbary dove was formerly believed to be a domesticated form of the Eurasian collared dove (Streptopelia decaocto), but genetic evidence has shown that it is a domesticated form of the African collared dove (Streptopelia roseogrisea).

There is a disagreement as to whether risoria should replace roseogrisea as the epithet for the African collared dove. In 2008 the International Commission on Zoological Nomenclature expressed an opinion that risoria should have priority, but this change has not been followed in the list maintained by Frank Gill, Pamela C. Rasmussen and David Donsker on behalf of the International Ornithological Committee (IOC), or by the Clements Checklist of Birds of the World maintained by members of Cornell University.

It appears that it can hybridize freely with either species, and its status as a species must therefore be regarded as doubtful. However, because of the wide use of both the common and systematic names, it is best to consider it separately from either of the parent species. Their time of domestication is also uncertain. While Linnaeus described them in 1758, they may have been imported into Italy from North Africa in the late 16th century.

== Behaviour ==
Barbary doves are easily kept and long-lived in captivity, living for up to 12 years. There have been cases of doves living over 20 years, and, in one case, of a dove living for 29 years. In recent years they have been used extensively in biological research, particularly into the hormonal bases of reproductive behaviour, because their sequences of courtship, mating and parental behaviour have been described accurately and are highly consistent in form. Dove fanciers have bred them in a great variety of colours; the number of colours available has increased dramatically in the latter half of the 20th century, and it is thought that this has been achieved by interbreeding with Streptopelia roseogrisea.

Some of these doves carry a mutation that makes them completely white. These white Barbary doves are most commonly used in stage magic acts. White Barbary doves are also traditionally released in large public ceremonies, since it is a peace symbol in several cultures, and "dove releases" are also sometimes found at weddings and funerals. However, a release dove is, in fact, usually a homing pigeon, as Barbary doves lack the homing instinct.

The coo of the Barbary dove is created by muscles that vibrate air sent up from the dove's lungs. These muscles belong to the fastest known class of vertebrate muscles, contracting as much as 10 times faster than muscles vertebrates use for running. This class of muscles is usually found in high speed tissue such as a rattlesnake's tail. Barbary doves are the first bird species to have been found to have this class of muscle.

=== Breeding ===
They can be crossed with the pigeon to create offspring, but the offspring are not fertile.

== Gallery ==
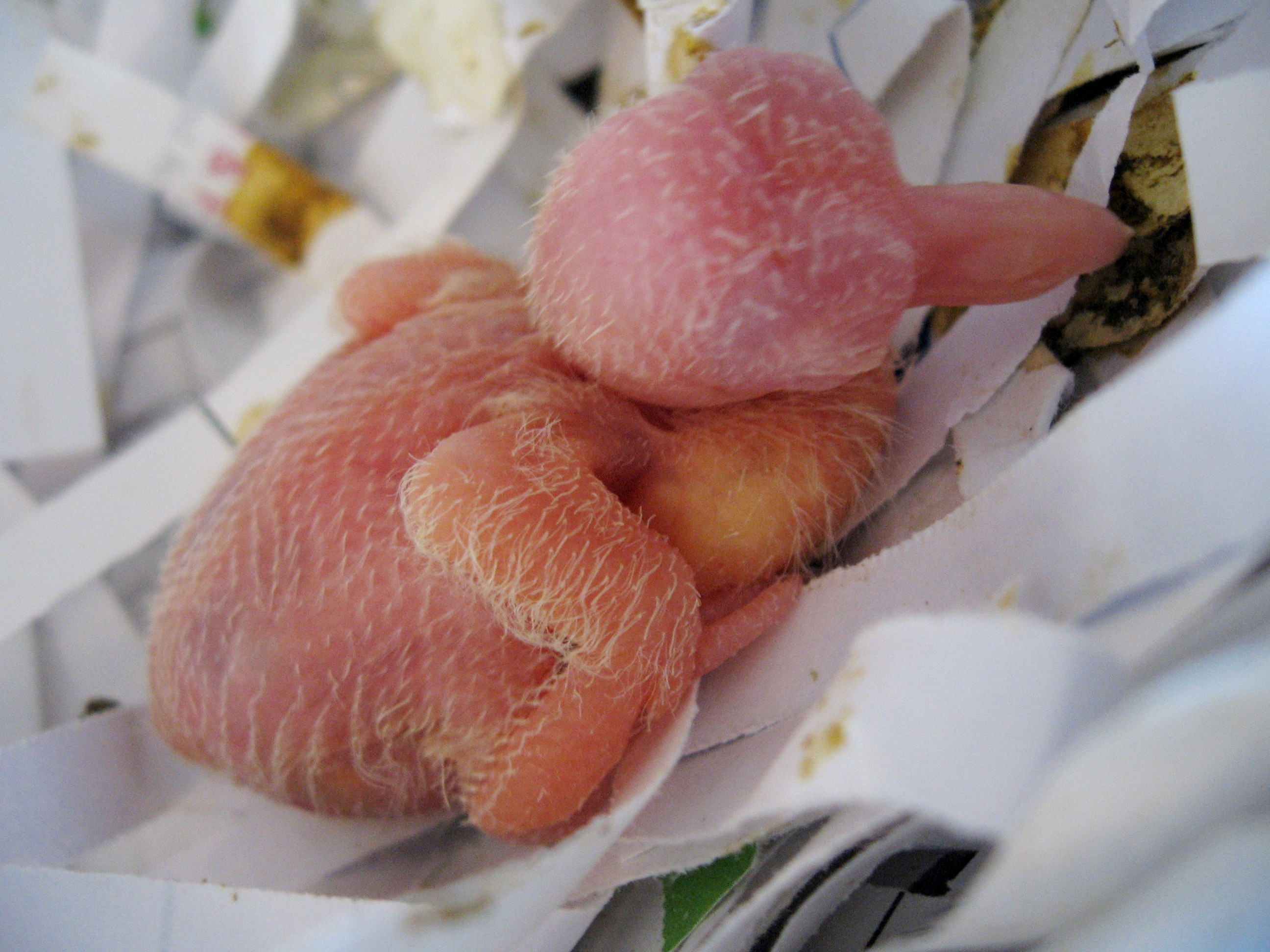
A two-day-old newly hatched Barbary dove

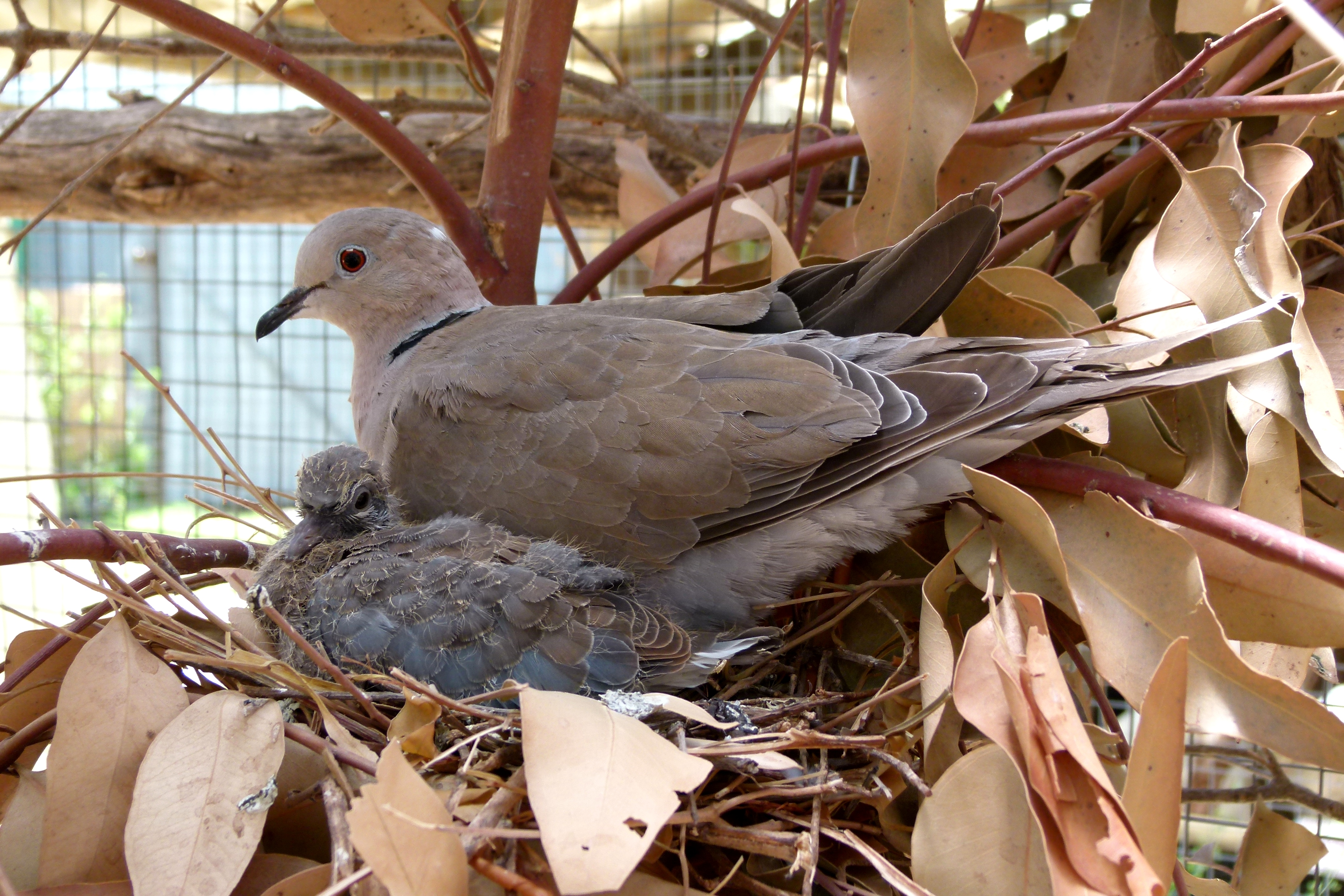
Adult and chick on nest

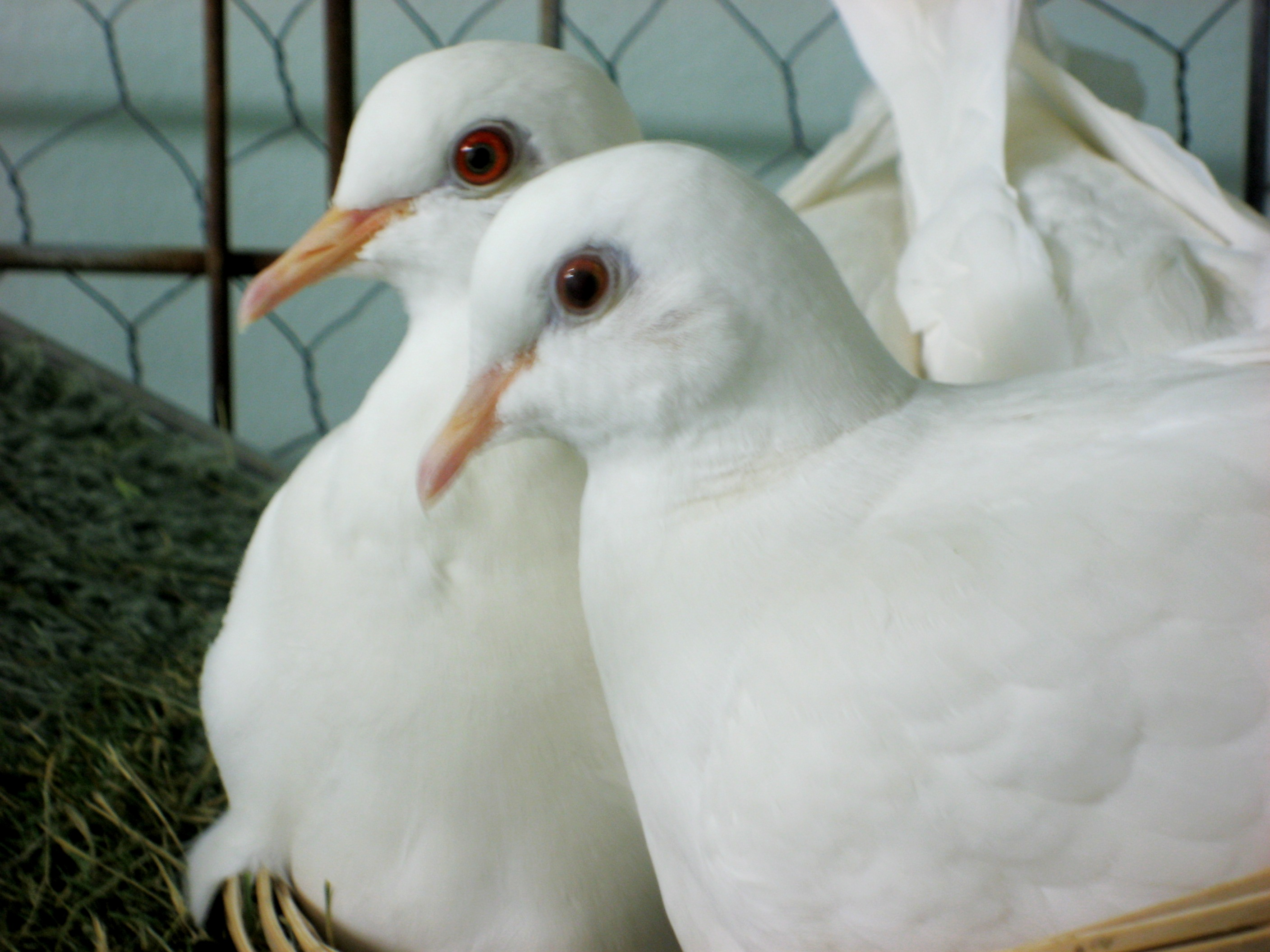
A close-up of a pair of white Barbary doves

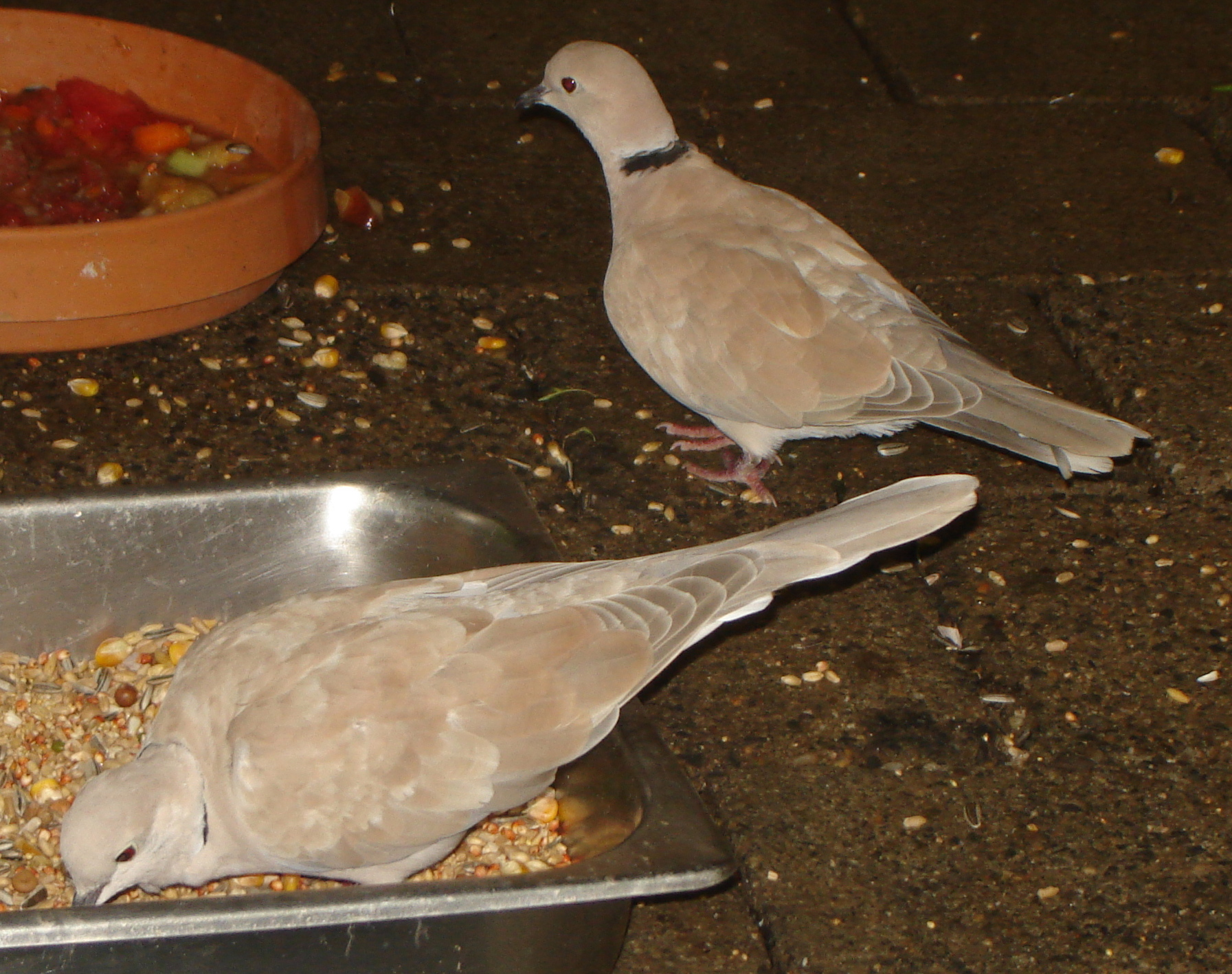
A pair of Barbary doves

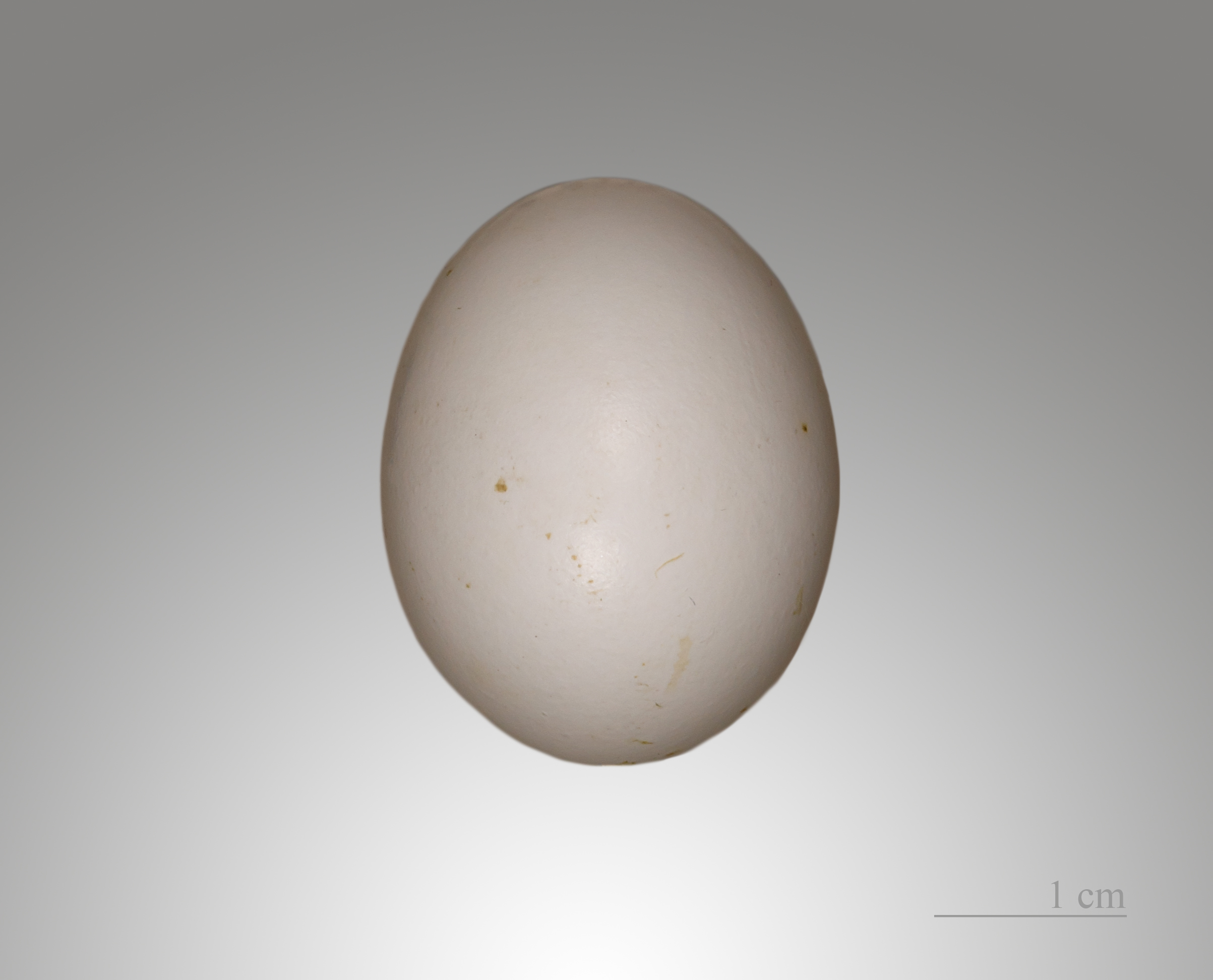
Egg of Streptopelia risoria
