= Poundbakery =

Bakery chain in the United Kingdom

- Type: Division
- Industry: Food (Bakery Group)
- Founded: 2010; 16 years ago
- Headquarters: Bolton, Greater Manchester, England
- Number of locations: 36
- Products: Sandwiches, pies and pastries; baked goods
- Owner: Sayers
- Website: poundbakery.co.uk

Poundbakery is a bakery chain in the United Kingdom, which specializes in savory products such as pies, pasties, sausage rolls, sandwich, and sweet products including doughnuts and muffins. It was established in Bolton, Greater Manchester, England by Sayers in 2010, the largest independent retail baker in the North West of England.
