= Dove Mulkey =

Arkansas state legislator (1891–1972)

Member of the Arkansas House of Representatives
- In office 1961–1964

Personal details
- Born: October 7, 1891
- Died: May 7, 1972 (aged 80)
- Party: Democratic

Dove Mulkey (October 7, 1891 – May 7, 1972) was a state legislator in the state of Arkansas. She served two terms in the Arkansas House of Representatives.

She was Dove Irene Toland before getting married. She married in 1914.

Her grandson Jim Hill served in the Arkansas House of Representatives from 1993 to 1996 and the Arkansas Senate from 1997 to 2007.
