= Heinrich Wilhelm Dove =

Prussian physicist and meteorologist (1803–1879)

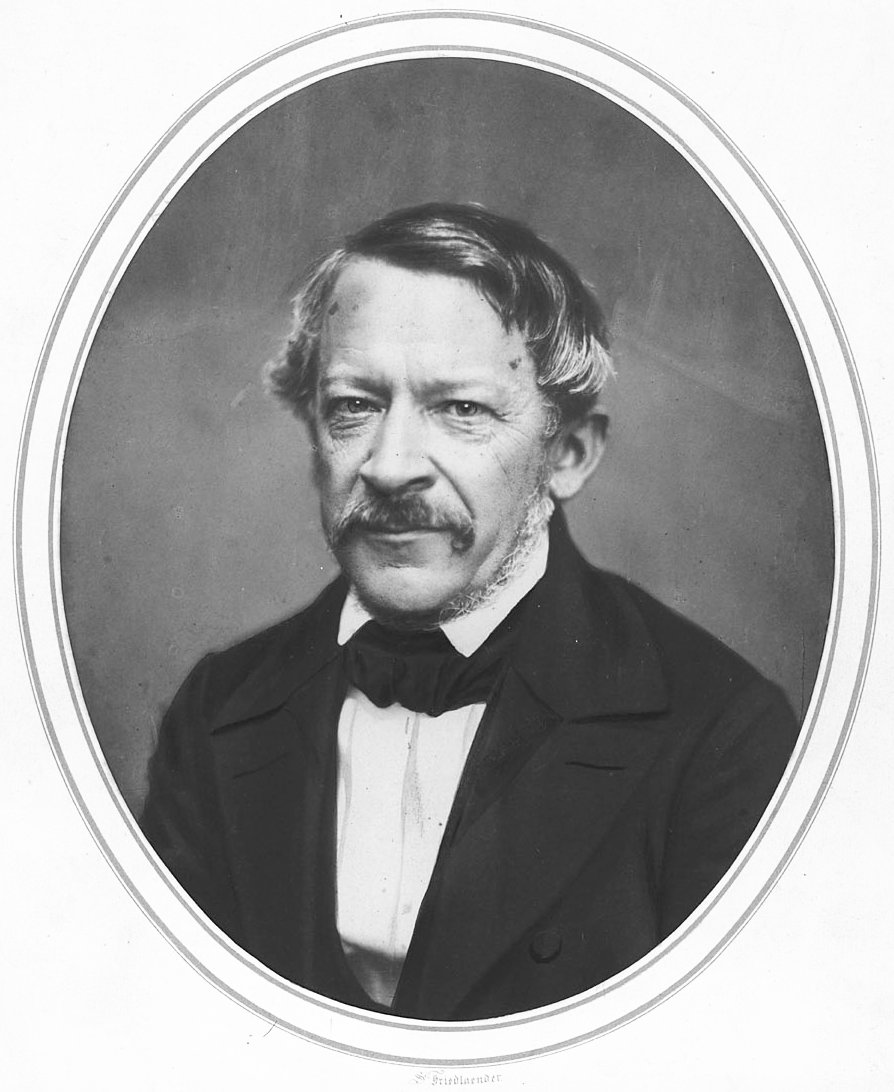
- Born: October 6, 1803; Liegnitz, Kingdom of Prussia
- Died: April 4, 1879 (aged 75); Berlin, Kingdom of Prussia, German Empire
- Education: University of Berlin; University of Breslau
- Scientific career
- Workplaces: University of Berlin; University of Königsberg

Heinrich Wilhelm Dove (6 October 1803 – 4 April 1879) was a Prussian physicist and meteorologist.

== Early years ==
Dove was born in Liegnitz in the Kingdom of Prussia. Dove studied history, philosophy, and the natural sciences at the University of Breslau from 1821 until 1824. In 1824, he continued his education at the University of Berlin, finishing in 1826. In 1826, he became a Privatdozent and in 1828 a Professor extraordinarius at the University of Königsberg. In 1829, he moved to Berlin and taught at the Friedrich Wilhelm Gymnasium.

In 1845, he became a Professor ordinarius at the Friedrich-Wilhelms-Universität in Berlin, where he was elected rector in 1858–1859, and again in 1871–1872. In 1849, he also became the director of the Prussian Meteorological Institute.

During his career he published more than 300 papers, some of which delved into experimental physics. He also had an important influence over the science of meteorology, and was considered by some to be a pioneer in this field; Dove's primary meteorological focus was in climatology, a field pioneered by Alexander von Humboldt.

In 1828, Dove observed that tropical cyclones rotate counterclockwise in the Northern Hemisphere, but clockwise in the Southern.

In 1839, he discovered the technique of binaural beats, whereby slightly different frequencies played separately to each ear produced a perception of interference beats at the same rate as would be physically created.

In 1841, he published an invention he called the "differential inductor". It was a 4 coil induction balance, with 2 glass tubes each having 2 well insulated copper wire solenoids wound around them. Charged Leyden jars (high voltage capacitors) were discharged through the 2 primary coils, this current surge induced a voltage in the secondary coils. When the secondary coils were wired in opposition the induced voltages cancelled as confirmed by the Professor holding the ends of the secondary coils. When a piece of metal was placed inside one glass tube the Professor received a shock. It was the first magnetic induction metal detector, and the first pulse induction metal detector.

He also studied the distribution of heat over the surface of the Earth, the effect of climate on the growth of plants, and was the first to measure the strength of an electric current in a wire induced by a collapsing magnetic field.

== Affiliations and honors ==
- Foreign Fellow of the Royal Society, 1850
- Member of the Prussian Academy of Sciences, 1837
- Recipient of the Copley Medal, 1853
- Foreign member of the Royal Netherlands Academy of Arts and Sciences, 1861
- Honorary Fellow of the Royal Society of Edinburgh
- Dove Bay in Greenland is named after him.
- The crater Dove on the Moon is named after him.
- In Optics, the Dove prism is named for him.
