= Monetary hawk and dove =

Term used to describe people by their preferred approach to monetary policy

A monetary hawk, refers to individuals who advocate for keeping inflation low as the top priority in monetary policy. In contrast, a monetary dove is someone who emphasizes other issues, especially low unemployment, over low inflation. The term monetary pigeon has been used to describe moderate or centrist viewpoints.

The two terms are commonly used in the United States to describe members and nominees to the Federal Reserve Board of Governors, who have major influence on United States monetary policy in their roles as Federal Reserve Governors and as members of the Federal Open Market Committee. The terms are also used outside of the United States, in places such as the United Kingdom and India.

Doves generally are more in favor of expansionary monetary policy, including low interest rates, while hawks tend to favor "tight" monetary policy. For example, doves in the United States tend to favor quantitative easing, seeing it as a way to stimulate the economy, while hawks tend to oppose quantitative easing, seeing it as a distortion of asset markets. Additionally, hawks tend to project higher future inflation, and hence see more risk from inflation and a greater need for tight monetary policies, while doves tend to predict lower future inflation, and hence see more need for expansionary monetary policies.

An individual can be a hawk in some cases and a dove in others. For example, Janet Yellen was described as a hawk during the economic boom of the 1990s, but was usually described as a dove when she was nominated to the position of Chair of the Federal Reserve. Additionally, the label of "hawk" and "dove" may be applied differently depending on the point of view.

The hawk–dove dichotomy has been criticized as overly simplistic, especially in times of deflation or low inflation. For example, Federal Reserve Bank of St. Louis President James Bullard has been described as a "deflation hawk" for favoring policies that would raise inflation to a target of 2 percent per year. Washington Post columnist Neil Irwin used the term "bubble hawk" to describe those who focus on using monetary policy to fight financial bubbles.

== See also ==
- Central bank
- Deficit hawk
- War hawk
- Federal Reserve System
- Monetary policy
