= The Dove (glacier) =

Cirque glacier in Colorado, U.S.

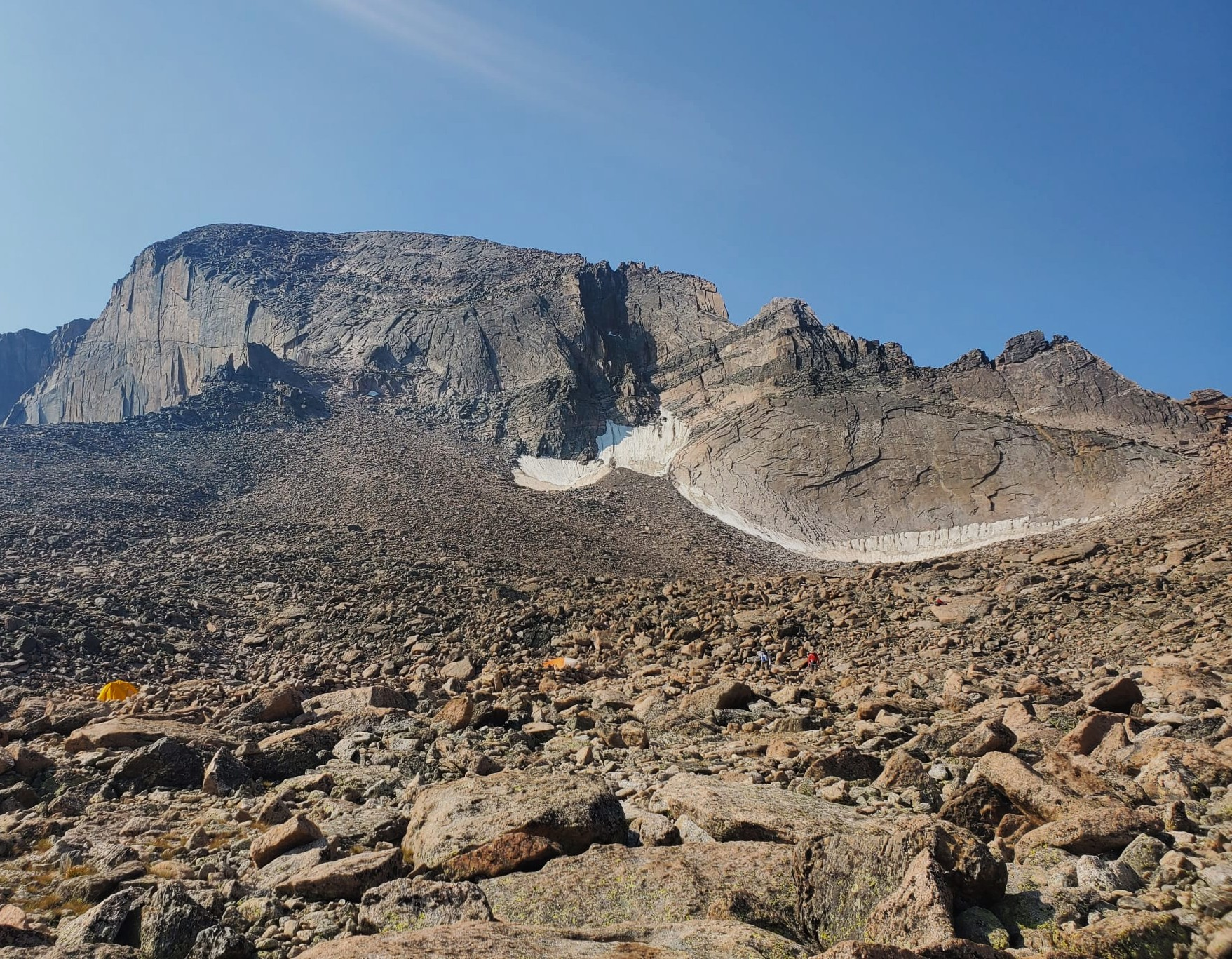
- The Dove with Longs Peak to its left

- Location within Colorado
- Type: Cirque glacier
- Location: Boulder County, Colorado, United States
- Coordinates: 40°15′32″N 105°37′05″W
- Terminus: Barren rock
- Status: Retreating

The Dove is a small cirque glacier or perennial snowfield located in Rocky Mountain National Park in the U.S. state of Colorado. The Dove is on the north slope of Longs Peak and near The Keyhole, which is along a popular climbing route to the summit.

== See also ==
- List of glaciers in the United States
