= Martyn Cornell =

English beer historian

Martyn A Cornell (1952–2025) was a beer historian.

Cornell was born in Hampstead, North London, the son of a bricklayer father and shorthand typist mother. He was raised in Stevenage, where he attended Alleyne's High School. He studied politics at the University of Sussex.

He trained as a journalist and worked for a number of regional newspapers in the South of England. He later became a subeditor at the Daily Telegraph. He first began writing about beer in 1980. He published a number of books on the subject, including Amber, Gold & Black: The History of Britain's Great Beers (2010) and Porter and Stout: A Complete History (2025).
