= List of amazon parrots =

Birds in parrot genus Amazona

The amazon parrots are 32 species of parrots that comprise the genus Amazona. They are native to the New World, ranging from South America to Mexico and the Caribbean. Amazon parrots range in size from medium to large, and have relatively short, rather square tails. They are predominantly green, with accenting colours that are quite vivid in some species.

The taxonomy of the yellow-crowned amazon (Amazona ochrocephala complex) is disputed, with some authorities listing only a single species (A. ochrocephala), and others splitting it into as many as three species (A. ochrocephala, A. auropalliata and A. oratrix). The yellow-faced parrot, Alipiopsitta xanthops, was traditionally placed within the amazon parrot genus, but recent research has shown that it is more closely related to the short-tailed parrot and species from the genus Pionus; as a result, it has been transferred to the monotypic genus Alipiopsitta.

Two extinct species have been postulated, based on limited evidence. They are the Martinique amazon (Amazona martinica) and the Guadeloupe amazon (Amazona violacea). Amazon parrots were described living on Guadeloupe by Jean-Baptiste Du Tertre in 1667 and by Jean-Baptiste Labat in 1742, and they were called Psittacus violaceus at that time. Labat also described amazon parrots living on Martinique. There are no specimens or remains of either island population, so their taxonomy may never be fully elucidated. Their status as separate species is unproven and they are regarded as hypothetical extinct species.

In 2017 a study published by ornithologists Tony Silva, Antonio Guzmán, Adam D. Urantówka and Paweł Mackiewicz proposed a new species for the Yucatan Peninsula area (Mexico), being this named blue-winged amazon (Amazona gomezgarzai). However, subsequent studies question its validity, indicating that these organisms possibly had an artificial hybrid origin.

== Species ==
Species of amazon parrots in taxonomic sequence
Common and binomial names	Image	Description	Range
Festive amazon (Amazona festiva)		Mostly green, red forehead, deep blue outer wing feathers, red rump.	Brazil, Colombia, Bolivia, Ecuador, Guyana, French Guiana, Peru, Venezuela
Vinaceous-breasted amazon (Amazona vinacea)		30 cm (12 in) long, mostly green, red forehead, bluish nape, vinous-maroon breast.	Argentina, Brazil, Paraguay
Tucumán amazon (Amazona tucumana)		31 cm (12 in) long, mostly green with feathers of the upper body being green with black margins. Red plumage on the forehead and forecrown, and the red does not extend around the white eye rings. Red primary wing feathers with no red at the bend of the wing. Orange thighs and red at the base of a green tail.	Argentina, Bolivia
Red-spectacled amazon (Amazona pretrei)		32 cm (12.5 in) long, mostly green with a variable extent of red on the forehead, lores, and around the eyes. The eye rings are white and the bill is yellowish. Red on the bend of the wings with blue tips to the primary and secondary wing feathers.	Argentina, Brazil, Paraguay
Black-billed amazon (Amazona agilis)		25 cm (10 in) long, mostly green with small patches of red on the wing and sometimes flecked with red on the head, black beak.	Jamaica
White-fronted amazon (Amazona albifrons)		25 cm (10 in) long, mostly green, white forehead with blue on the crown, red on the sides of the face. Sexual dimorphism: males have bright red feathers on their shoulders, while females have green shoulders.	Belize, Costa Rica, El Salvador, Guatemala, Honduras, Mexico, Nicaragua
Yellow-billed amazon (Amazona collaria)		28 cm (11 in) long, mostly green, white face markings and white forehead, blue forecrown, pink throat and upper breast, bluish primaries, yellow bill.	Jamaica
Cuban amazon or rose-throated amazon (Amazona leucocephala)		28–33 cm (11–13 in) long, mostly green, white on the face, pink throat, brownish on the belly.	Cuba, the Bahamas, Cayman Islands
Hispaniolan amazon (Amazona ventralis)		28–31 cm (11–12 in) long, mostly green, white forehead, blue flight feathers, maroon belly and red in the tail feathers.	Hispaniola (Haiti and the Dominican Republic)
Puerto Rican amazon (Amazona vittata)		28–30 cm (11–12 in) long, mostly green, red forehead, white eye rings, and blue flight feathers.	Puerto Rico
Lilac-crowned amazon (Amazona finschi)		30.5–34.5 cm (12–14 in) long, mostly green, maroon forehead, violet-blue crown.	Northwestern to southwestern Mexico
Red-lored amazon (Amazona autumnalis)		32–35 cm (13 in) long, mostly green, red forehead and, in some subspecies, yellow cheeks (sometimes with red spots), blue crown.	Central and South America
Lilacine amazon (Amazona lilacina)		The lilacine amazon is a small parrot, approximately 34 cm long when mature, with primarily green plumage. Like the red-lored amazon, it has red lores and yellow cheeks; its distinguishing features include a fully black beak, and lilac-tipped feathers on its crown.	Western Ecuador to extreme south-western Colombia
Diademed amazon (Amazona diadema)		Length of about 33 cm (13 in). Largely green bird with glimpses of red and black; many of the feathers are margined with contrasting colours giving a finely scalloped effect.	Amazon basin in northern Brazil
Red-crowned amazon (Amazona viridigenalis)		33 cm (13 in) long, mostly green, bright red forehead and crown, dark blue streaks behind the eyes, and light green cheeks. Less red on the crown of the female and the juvenile.	Mexico, United States (Texas)
Yucatan amazon (Amazona xantholora)		Mostly green, blue crown and yellow on the sides of the face, horn-coloured (grey) beak.	Belize, Honduras, Mexico
Blue-cheeked amazon or Dufresne's amazon (Amazona dufresniana)		34 cm (13.5 in) long, mostly green, blue cheeks.	French Guiana, Guyana, Suriname, Venezuela, possibly in northern Brazil
Red-browed amazon (Amazona rhodocorytha)		35 cm (14 in) long, mostly green, red forehead fading to brownish-purple on the crown, orange lores and yellow below the lores, bluish to violet cheeks and throat.	Eastern Brazil
Red-necked amazon (Amazona arausiaca)		40 cm (16 in) long, mostly green, blue forehead and face, white bare eye rings, red patch on the throat (sometimes absent).	Dominica
Saint Lucia amazon (Amazona versicolor)		43 cm (17 in) long, mostly green, blue face and forehead, red breast becoming maroon and mottled on the lower breast and belly.	Saint Lucia
Yellow-headed amazon (Amazona oratrix)		35–38 cm (14–15 in) long, mostly green, yellow head.	Belize, Guatemala, Mexico
Yellow-naped amazon (Amazona auropalliata)		Mostly green, yellow band across the lower nape and hindneck.	Costa Rica, El Salvador, Guatemala, Honduras, Mexico, Nicaragua
Yellow-crowned amazon (Amazona ochrocephala)		33–38 cm (13–15 in) long, mostly green, extent of the yellow on the head varies between subspecies.	South America, Panama
Panama amazon (Amazona ochrocephala panamensis)		35 centimetres (13.8 in) in length, are bright green with a yellow area on the forehead, and a horn-colored (gray) beak, sometimes with a dark tip, but lacking the reddish coloring on the upper mandible that is present in the nominate yellow-crowned amazon.	Panama (including the Pearl Islands and Coiba) and northwest Colombia
Yellow-shouldered amazon (Amazona barbadensis)		33 cm (13 in) long, mostly green, white forehead and lores, yellow crown and ear coverts, bare white eye rings. Yellow chin and shoulders. Some red and dark blue in the wing feathers.	The Netherlands Antilles, Venezuela
Blue-fronted amazon (Amazona aestiva)		38 cm (15 in) long, mostly green, blue forehead and yellow on the face.	Bolivia, Brazil, Paraguay, northern Argentina
Scaly-naped amazon (Amazona mercenarius)		Mostly green.	Bolivia, Colombia, Ecuador, Peru, Venezuela
Mealy amazon (Amazona farinosa)		38–41 cm (15–16 in) long, mostly green, extent of yellow and green on the forehead and crown varies between subspecies.	Mexico, Central and South America
Kawall's amazon (Amazona kawalli)		Large and mostly green, white skin at the base of the bill.	Bolivia, Brazil
Imperial amazon (Amazona imperialis)		45 cm (18 in) long, mostly green, purple neck, green-tipped red tail and purple below.	Dominica
Red-tailed amazon (Amazona brasiliensis)		37 cm (14.4 in) long, mostly green, red forehead fading to purple on the crown. Blue throat, cheeks and over the ears. Red in the tail feathers.	Southeastern Brazil
Orange-winged amazon (Amazona amazonica)		33 cm (13 in) long, mostly green, blue and yellow feathers on the head which varies in extent between individuals. The upper mandible is partly horn-coloured (grey) and partly dark grey. It has orange feathers in the wings and tail.	South America
Saint Vincent amazon (Amazona guildingii)		40 cm (16 in) long, mostly green, multi-coloured with a yellowish-white, blue and green head, greenish-bronze upperparts, grey feet, orange irises, and violet blue-green wings and tail feathers. There is a yellow-brown morph and a less common green morph.	The Caribbean island of Saint Vincent in the Lesser Antilles

== See also ==
- List of parrots
- Neotropical parrot
- List of macaws
- List of Ramphastos species and subspecies
