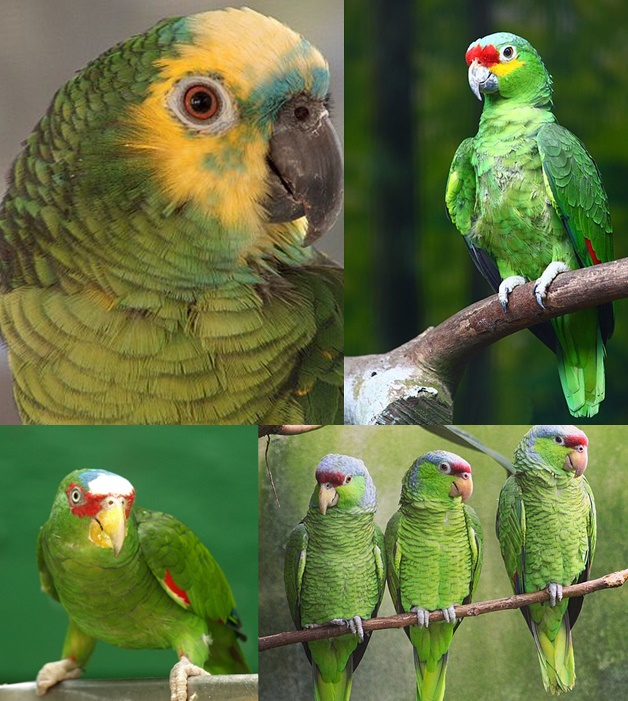
- Collage of four amazon parrots (in clockwise: Blue-fronted parrot, Red-lored parrot, Lilac-crowned parrot and White-fronted parrot).

Scientific classification
- Kingdom: Animalia
- Phylum: Chordata
- Class: Aves
- Order: Psittaciformes
- Family: Psittacidae
- Tribe: Androglossini
- Genus: Amazona; Lesson, 1830

Type species
- Psittacus farinosus Boddaert, 1783

Diversity
- c. 30 species

= Amazon parrot =

Amazon parrots

Genus of birds

Amazon parrots are parrots in the genus Amazona. They are medium-sized, short-tailed parrots native to the Americas, with their range extending from South America to Mexico and the Caribbean. Amazona is one of the 92 genera of parrots that make up the order Psittaciformes and are in the family Psittacidae, one of three families of true parrots. It contains about 30 species. Most amazons are predominantly green, with accenting colors that depend on the species, and they can be quite vivid. They feed primarily on seeds, nuts, and fruits, supplemented by leafy matter.

Many amazons have the ability to mimic human speech and other sounds. Partly because of this, they are popular as pets or companion parrots, and a small industry has developed in breeding parrots in captivity for this market. This popularity has led to many parrots being taken from the wild to the extent that some species have become threatened. The United States and the European Union have made the capture of wild parrots for the pet trade illegal in an attempt to help protect wild populations. Feral populations of amazons can be found in different parts of the world, including in southern Africa, Europe, and major cities in the Americas.

== Taxonomy ==
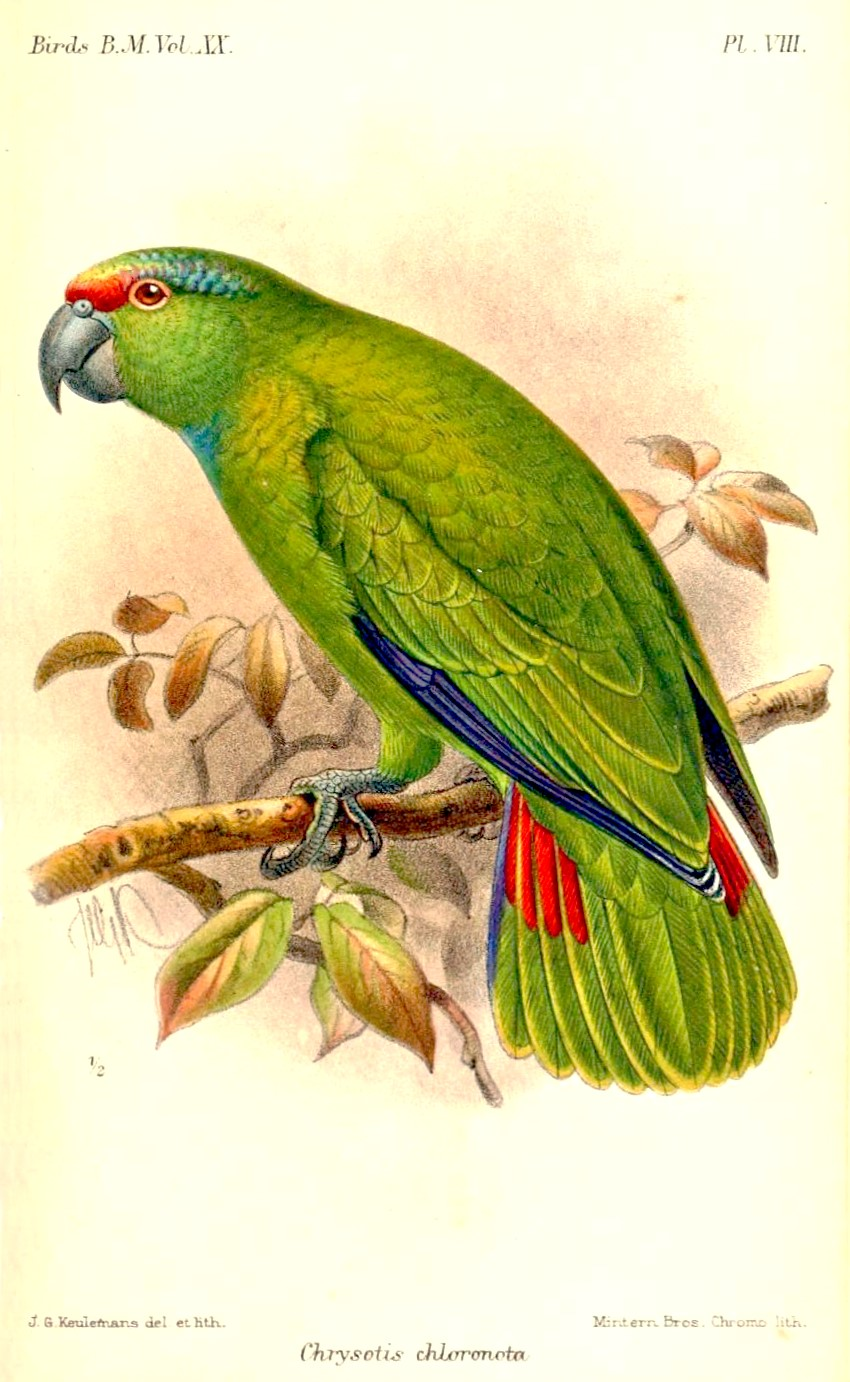
Festive amazon (Amazona festiva), color illustration by Keulemans, 1891

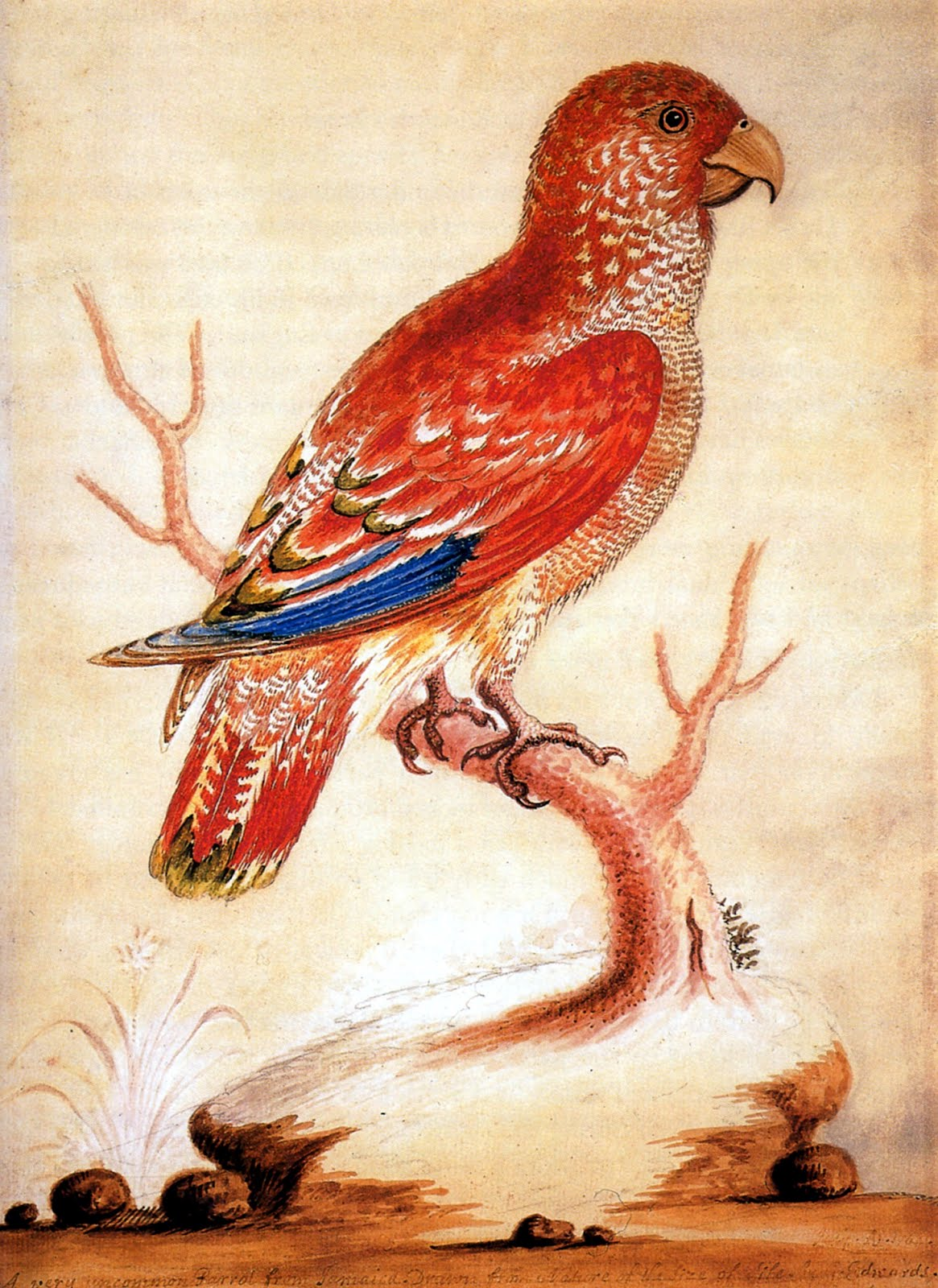
Color drawing of an unidentified Jamaican parrot, possibly belonging to this genus, 1764

The genus Amazona was introduced by French naturalist René Lesson in 1830. The type species was subsequently designated as the mealy amazon (Amazona farinosa) by the Italian zoologist Tommaso Salvadori in 1891. The genus name is a Latinized version of the name Amazone given to them in the 18th century by the Comte de Buffon, who believed they were native to Amazonian jungles.

Amazona contains about 30 species of parrots, such as the Cuban amazon, festive amazon, and red-necked amazon. The taxonomy of the yellow-crowned amazon (Amazona ochrocephala complex) is disputed, with some authorities only listing a single species (A. ochrocephala), while others split it into as many as three species (A. ochrocephala, A. auropalliata, and A. oratrix). The split is primarily based on differences related to extension of yellow to the plumage and the colour of bill and legs. Phylogenetic analyses of mtDNA do not support the traditional split.

A 2017 study published by ornithologists Tony Silva, Antonio Guzmán, Adam D. Urantówka, and Paweł Mackiewicz proposed a new species from the Yucatán Peninsula area in Mexico called the blue-winged amazon (Amazona gomezgarzai). Subsequent studies question its validity, though, indicating that these organisms possibly had an artificial hybrid origin.

The yellow-faced parrot (Alipiopsitta xanthops) was traditionally placed within this genus, but recent research has shown that it is more closely related to the short-tailed parrot and species in the genus Pionus, resulting in it being transferred to the monotypic genus Alipiopsitta.

=== Extinct hypothetical species ===
Populations of amazon parrots that lived on the Caribbean islands of Martinique and Guadeloupe are now extinct. Whether they were distinct species or subspecies, or if they originated from parrots introduced to the islands by humans is unknown, so they are regarded as hypothetical extinct species. No evidence of them remains, and their taxonomy may never be established. Populations of several parrot species were described mainly in the unscientific writings of early travelers and subsequently scientifically described by several naturalists (to have their names linked to the species that they were proposing) mainly in the 20th century, with no more evidence than the earlier observations and without specimens. An illustration of a specimen termed "George Edwards' parrot" has sometimes been considered a possibly distinct, extinct species, but it may also have been a yellow-billed or Cuban amazon with aberrant colouration.

- Martinique amazon, Amazona martinica A.H. Clark, 1905
- Guadeloupe amazon, Amazona violacea (originally called Psittacus violaceus by J.F. Gmelin in 1789)

== Description ==
Most amazon parrots are predominantly green, with contrasting colors on parts of the body such as the crown, face, and flight feathers; these colours vary by species. They are medium- to large-sized parrots, measuring between 23 and 45 cm (9 and 17 3/4 in) long, and have short, rounded tails and wings. They are heavy-billed, and have a distinct notch on the upper mandible and a prominent naked cere with setae on it. Male and female amazon parrots are roughly the same size, though males can be larger at times - most amazon parrots do not show sexual dimorphism, exceptions being the white-fronted amazon, Yucatan amazon, and turquoise-fronted amazon, the latter species being sexually dimorphic when viewed in the ultraviolet spectrum, invisible to humans. They can weigh from 190 to more than 565 g. The average body temperature of an amazon parrot is 41.8 °C (107.1 °F). Their heart rates range from 340 to 600 beats per minute, with 15-45 breaths per minute.

== Distribution and habitat ==
Amazon parrots are native to the Neotropical Americas, ranging from South America to Mexico and the Caribbean. Outside of their native habitats, more than 14 species of amazon parrots have been observed. In Italy, two reproductive populations of Amazona occur, dating back to their introduction in 1991 to the city of Genoa. The birds are present in Germany, but their status is unclear. They are also found in Spain, where the most common parrot present is the turquoise-fronted amazon. Portugal, California (where the birds were largely introduced during the 20th century), Puerto Rico, South Africa, and the Netherlands have also reported sightings of Amazona parrots. More than 12 species of amazon parrots can be found in the US state of Florida, mostly around the city of Miami. Feral populations are also present in São Paulo, Porto Alegre, Buenos Aires, and Río Cuarto within South America.

Amazon parrots mostly inhabit forests such as scrub forests, palm groves, and rainforests, but some prefer drier areas such as savannas. Vinaceous-breasted amazons are thought to prefer parana pine trees, and have been shown to prefer forest fragments or isolated trees, while Tucumán amazons nest at higher elevations than other amazon parrots, mostly in Blepharocalyx trees, within the cloud-forest. Yellow-headed amazons nest in the canopy of tall trees, mostly in Astronium graveolens and Enterolobium cyclocarpum.

== Behavior ==
=== Breeding ===
The exact breeding age of wild birds is not precisely known. For captive-bred birds, the typical breeding age is around four years, with some larger birds like yellow-crowned amazons requiring six years. Captive birds as old as 30 years have laid eggs. Amazon parrots average 5 weeks for nest initiation, with most successful nestings averaging 2.2 fledglings. Amazon parrots mostly breed during late winter and spring, as they are seasonal breeders. This may happen due to seasonal food availability or a lower chance of flooding, as the period is generally dry. West Indian amazon parrots tend to breed earlier than Mexican amazon parrots, with the latter having their peak from March to April while the former parrots peak in March.

Captive birds are likelier to be less fertile than wild ones. A variety of hypotheses to explain the phenomenon have been proposed: Low (1995) suggests that this is because amazon parrots have shorter breeding seasons, while Hagen (1994) suggests that this is because male and female parrots may not be ready for breeding at the same times.

=== Feeding ===
Amazon parrots feed primarily on seeds, nuts, fruits, berries, buds, nectar, and flowers, supplemented by leafy matter. Their beaks enable them to crack nut shells with ease, and they hold their food with a foot. In captivity, the birds consume vegetables such as squash, boiled potato, peas, beans, and carrots. Mainland amazon parrots forage and then feed their young twice a day (usually one hour after sunrise and one and a half hours before sunset), while West Indian amazon parrots do so four or five times daily. Hypotheses proposed for why this is include the nutritional value of food in the region and temperature stress. During the downtime before foraging expeditions in the afternoon, amazon parrots spend their time preening themselves and their mates.

=== Communication and sociality ===
Amazon parrots mostly communicate vocally. Species such as orange-winged amazons have nine different recorded vocalizations used in different situations. However, patterns of gestural communication have been observed with the birds, thought to be used to avoid predators. In general, amazon parrots are very social birds in their foraging, roosting, and nesting. Most of them travel in large groups and have clumped nesting, but the four species in the Lesser Antilles are less social, possibly due to the lack of predation risk. In captivity, amazon parrots are known for their ability to talk- learning to communicate by mimicking speech and other sounds of human origin. They also appear to have an affinity for human music and singing.

Extensive studies of vocal behavior in wild yellow-naped amazons show the presence of vocal dialects, in which the repertoire of calls that parrots vocalize change at discrete geographic boundaries, similar to how humans have different languages or dialects. Dialects are stable over long periods of time and are meaningful to the parrots; they are less responsive to calls that are not in their own dialect.

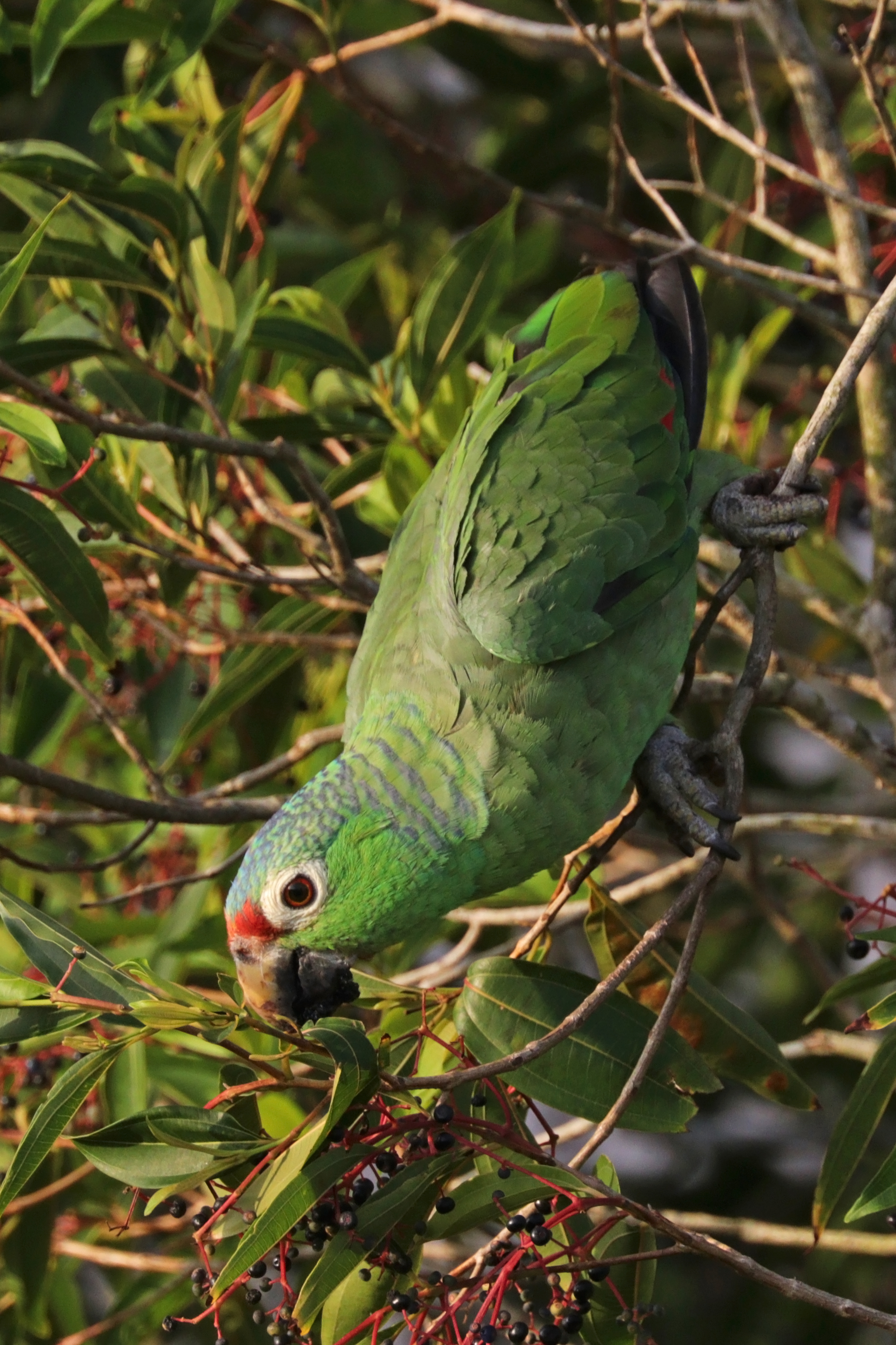
A. autumnalis salvini (red-lored parrot) feeding

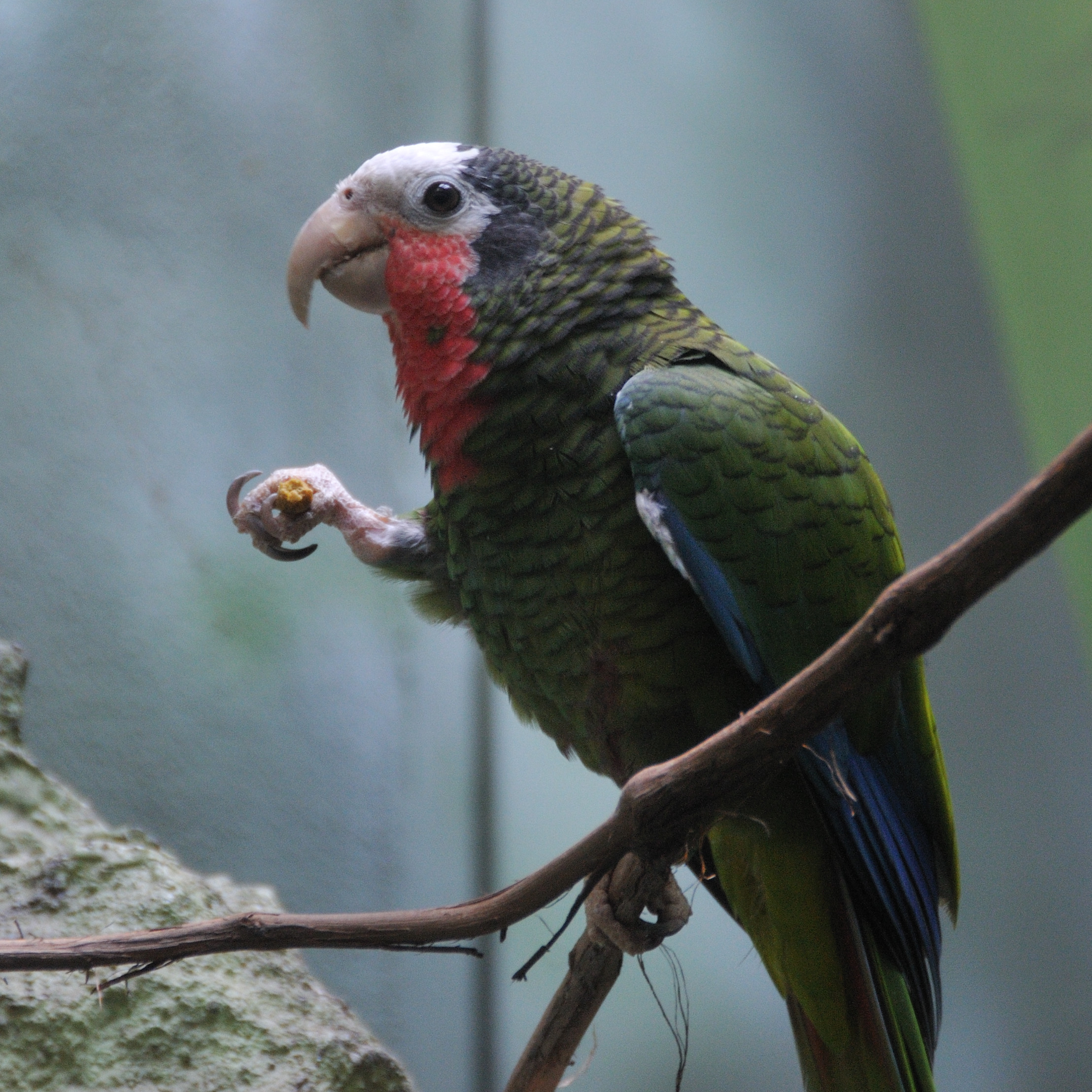
A. leucocephala (Cuban parrot) feeding using its foot

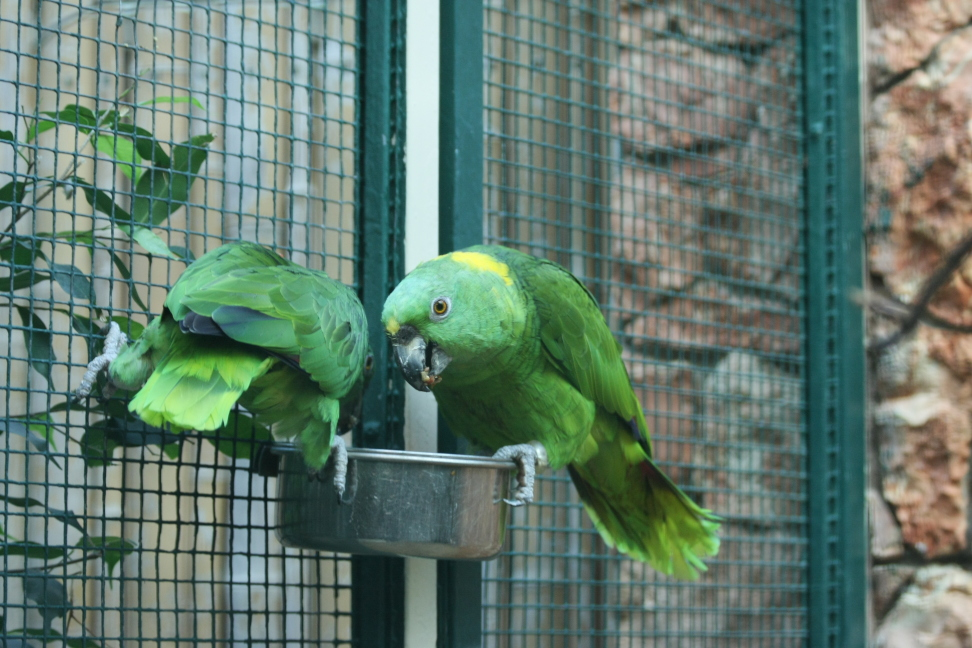
Two captive A. auropalliata (Yellow-naped parrots) feeding

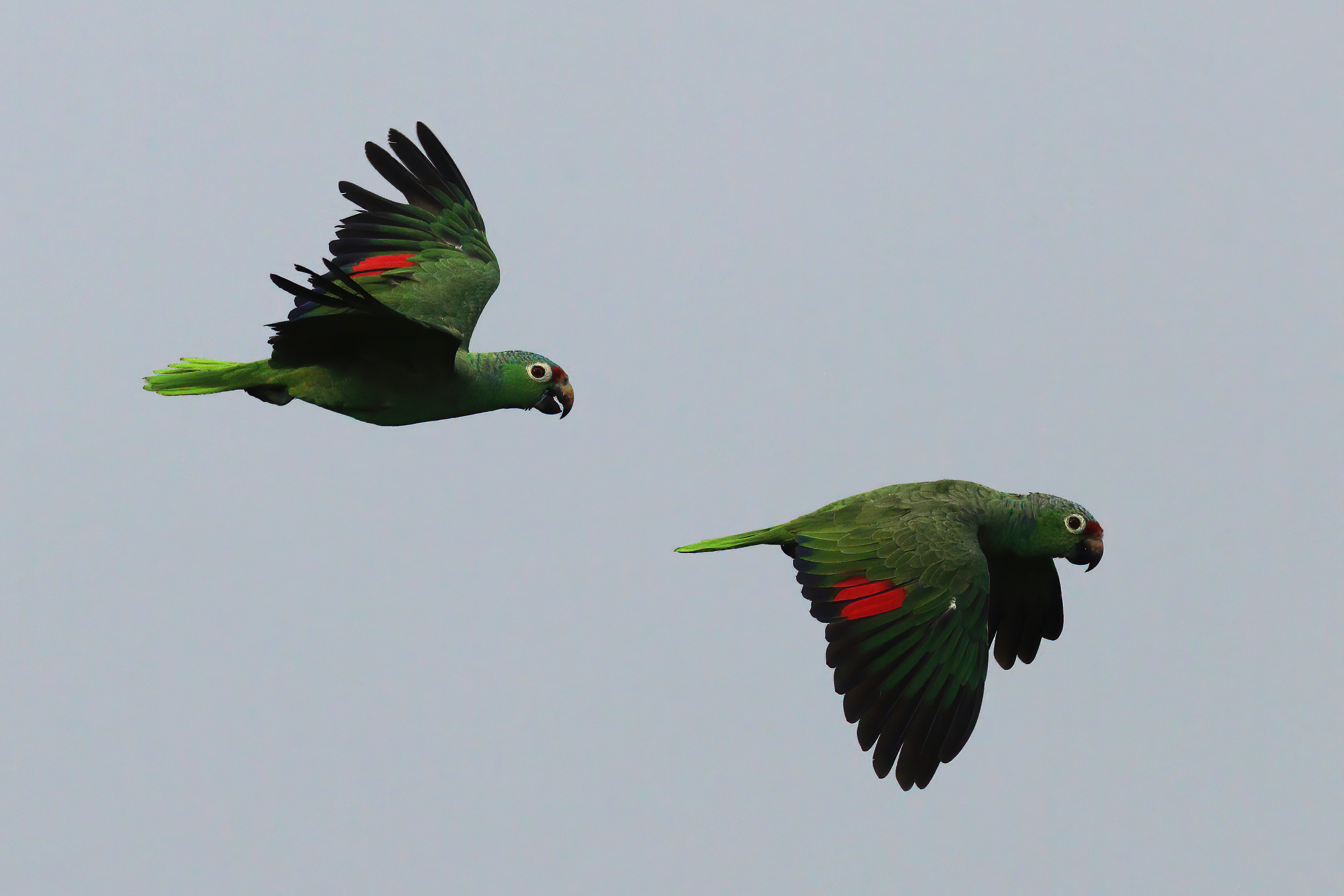
Two A. autumnalis salvini (red-lored parrots) flying together

== Conservation status ==
As of June 2020, 18 of 31 (58%) of species were listed by the International Union for Conservation of Nature as threatened or extinct in the wild. The most common threats are habitat loss, persecution, the pet trade, and the introduction of other species. The Puerto Rican amazon is critically endangered; 15 species are on Appendix 1 of the Convention on International Trade in Endangered Species, while 16 are on Appendix 2. For illegal smuggling of amazon parrots, some smugglers bleach the heads of green-headed parrots to make them look yellow and sell them off as young amazon parrots, which can cause dermatitis. The United States Fish and Wildlife Service and the United States Department of Agriculture sometimes confiscate and quarantine parrots for Newcastle disease and then auction them off.

The Puerto Rican parrot in particular, as a critically endangered species, has seen considerable conservation efforts, including changes in land management, legal protection, research, and increasing nesting success. However, these efforts were significantly hindered by natural events such as Hurricane Hugo, which affected the Luquillo forest in which most Puerto Rican parrots were living.

Within the rest of the West Indies, the four species of amazon parrots in the Lesser Antilles have seen successful attempts at increasing their population. In the Greater Antilles, the population of amazon parrots has been stable. The Cuban amazon has seen greatly successful conservation efforts and as a result has experienced a large increase in its population.

== Aviculture ==
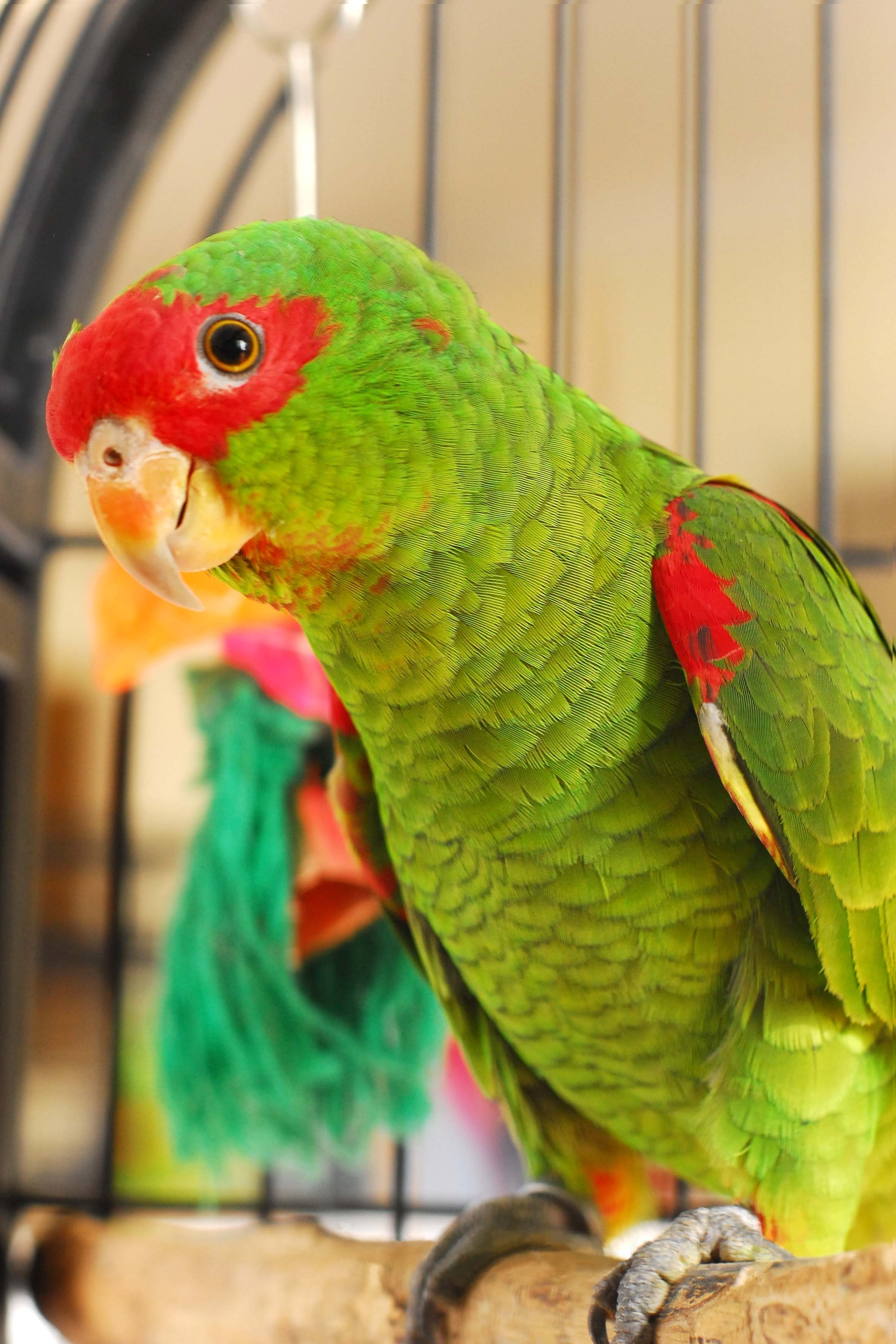
A. pretrei in a cage

Low (2005) describes adaptability and joyfulness as the special positive attributes of the genus from an avicultural perspective. The yellow-headed amazon, yellow-naped amazon, and turquoise-fronted amazon are some of the species commonly kept as pets. They can live for 30 to 50 years, with one report of a yellow-crowned amazon living for 56 years in captivity. Some amazons, though, can have hormonally induced aggressiveness and attack their owners, which has led to owners seeking behavior modification for their parrots. Conversely, unlike many other amazon species, the lilacine amazon and mealy amazon are said to possess gentle, easy-going and affectionate temperaments. To maintain health and happiness, pet parrots require much more training than domesticated animals such as dogs or even cats. They require understanding, manipulative toys, and rewards for good pet-like behavior, or they can develop quite aggressive behaviors (particularly male birds), which can be clearly observed through the bird's body language - pinning the eyes, flaring the tail, raising the head and neck feathers and engaging in a "macho strut". They have a strong, innate need to chew; thus, they require safe, destructible toys. One of the main problems amazon parrots face in captivity is obesity, which can be avoided with the correct diet and exercise. Within captivity, feeding amazon parrots a variety of food, mostly consisting of pelleted food, is recommended. Seeds should never be used as a whole diet and should be used as part of a balanced diet, balanced with food such as fresh fruit (except avocado, which is toxic to parrots) and vegetables, with nuts and seeds provided only in moderation. Amazon parrots should also be given opportunities to forage for food instead of simply being given it, as they are motivated to forage even when an easier alternative is available.

Amazon parrots should be given a dark and quiet sleeping area. Giving the bird either downtime and naps or to keep them in total darkness for 12 hours so they can rest is suggested. Parrots also need to be bathed or sprayed with water once per week to allow for bathing behaviors.

=== Trade ===
Amazon parrots are traded and exploited as pets. Archeological evidence shows that the parrot trade has existed in South America since pre-Columbian times, with mummified parrots (including amazon species) being found in the Atacama Desert region of Chile. The most traded species of amazons are blue-fronted amazons and yellow-crowned/yellow-headed amazons. A 1992 ban on wild bird trade by the US led to a sharp drop in the trade and a diversion of 66% of it to the European Union, and a further EU ban on the trade in 2005 led to another drop. Between 1980 and 2013, 372,988 amazon parrots were traded. Some illegal trade still occurs between Mexico and the United States.
