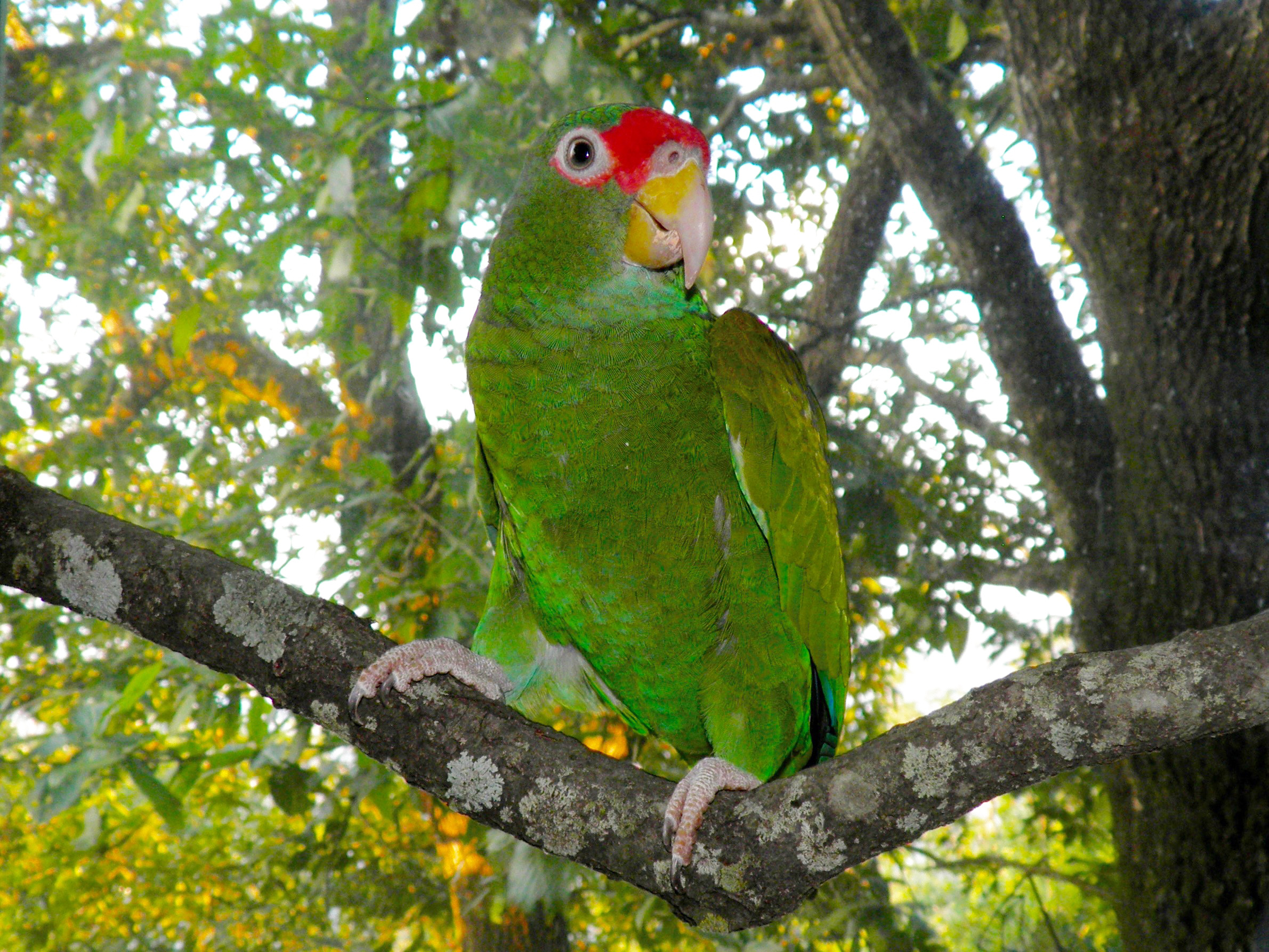

Scientific classification
- Kingdom: Animalia
- Phylum: Chordata
- Class: Aves
- Order: Psittaciformes
- Family: Psittacidae
- Genus: Amazona
- Species: A. gomezgarzai

Binomial name
- Amazona gomezgarzai Silva, Guzman, Urantowka & Mackiewicz 2017

= Blue-winged amazon =

Central American species of parrot

The blue-winged amazon (Amazona gomezgarzai) is a proposed Central American species of parrot living in the Yucatan Peninsula, Mexico. It was described in 2017 in the journal PeerJ; however, its existence as a distinct wild species native to the Yucatan Peninsula has been questioned. A critique published in the journal Zootaxa identified numerous weaknesses with the description and suggested that the most plausible hypothesis was that the two specimens on which the description was based were hybrids.

== Description ==
The proposed species was described as having an average body length of 25 cm (9.8 in) and a body weight of 200 g (7.1 oz). It is characterized by distinct sexual dimorphism, with males larger than females. Depending on the sex, wing length is 170–175 mm (6.7–6.9 in) and the tail length is 84–90 mm (3.3–3.5 in). Most of the body is covered with green plumage. However, these parrots differ in size and detail of the colors of the plumage from other Amazons found on the Yucatan peninsula (i.e., the white-fronted amazon – Amazona albifrons and the Yucatan amazon – Amazona xantholora).

The forehead and feathers around the male's eye are red. In females, red feathers are restricted to the forehead. Remiges (primaries and secondaries) are blue and green. The tail feathers are green with blue and green tips and red spots on the inner side.

== Call ==
They produce distinctive loud, sharp and repetitive sounds that resemble a hawk, a natural predator of these birds. It is possible that this sound is used to alert other birds. The syllables are 3–5 times longer than those of white-fronted amazon and Yucatan amazon.

== Behaviour ==
They live in groups up to a dozen individuals. Couples and their adult offspring tend to remain together as a group.

== Taxonomy ==
Genetic analyzes based on mitochondrial DNA indicate close affinity with the white-fronted amazon and suggests that the blue-winged amazon could be a subspecies of it. However, this may be due to the introgression of mitochondrial DNA or too little variation in the loci examined. It is possible that the new species has evolved relatively recently (about 120,000 years ago) within one of the white-fronted amazon populations.

The proposed species was reported as discovered in 2014 by veterinarian and researcher at the Autonomous University of Nuevo León (UANL), Miguel Ángel Gómez Garza, during one of his expeditions on the Yucatan Peninsula and was described by Tony Silva and colleagues. The species has yet to be recognized by leading taxonomic authorities including the International Union for the Conservation of Nature (IUCN), the International Ornithologists' Union (IOU), or the American Ornithological Society (AOS).

== Controversy ==
One of the authors, Tony Silva, was prosecuted in Chicago in March 1996 because he attempted to illegally introduce hundreds of exotic birds to the United States from Mexico and Central America, and, the original collector was reportedly and assessor in 2019 of Roberto Chavarria Gallegos, the then director of Parks and Wildlife of Nuevo Leon, who was denounced for the supposed illegal acquisition of 6 flamingos for the Zoo "La Pastora" from a suspected phantom wildlife trader.
