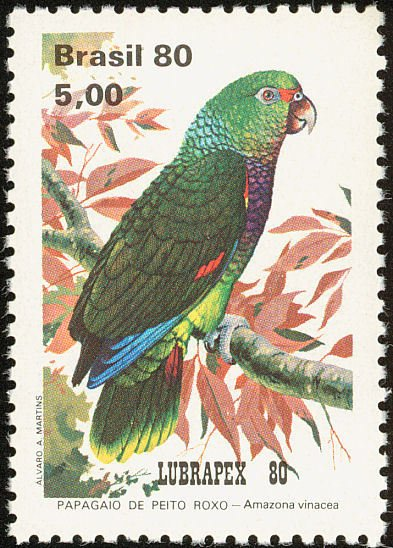

Conservation status
- Endangered (IUCN 3.1)
- CITES Appendix I

Scientific classification
- Kingdom: Animalia
- Phylum: Chordata
- Class: Aves
- Order: Psittaciformes
- Family: Psittacidae
- Genus: Amazona
- Species: A. vinacea

Binomial name
- Amazona vinacea (Kuhl, 1820)

= Vinaceous-breasted amazon =

Species of bird

The vinaceous-breasted amazon (Amazona vinacea), also called the vinaceous-breasted parrot and occasionally simply vinaceous amazon/parrot is an endangered species of bird in subfamily Arinae of the family Psittacidae, the African and New World parrots. It is found in Argentina, Brazil, and Paraguay.

== Taxonomy and systematics ==
The vinaceous-breasted amazon is monotypic.

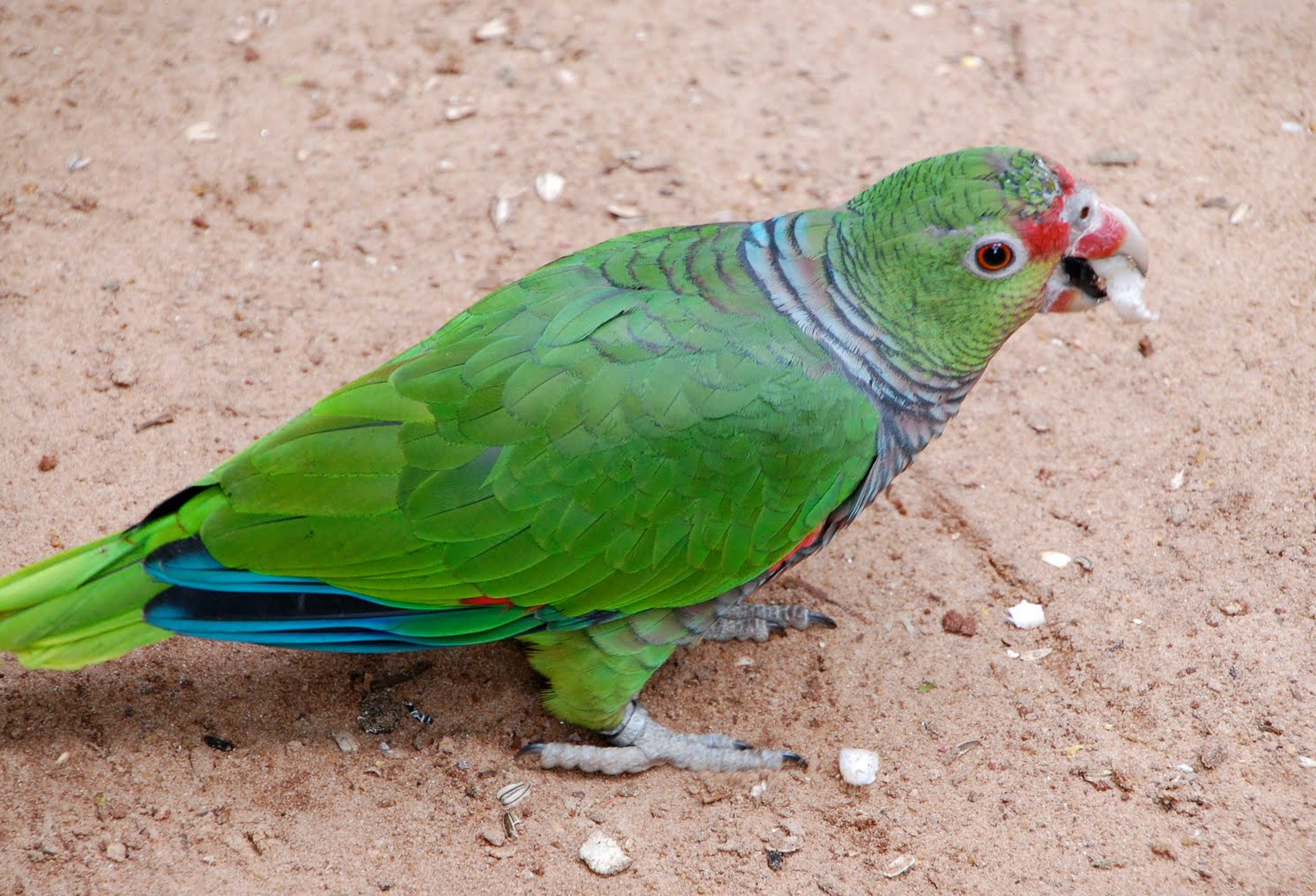
At Iguazu Bird Park, Brazil

== Description ==
The vinaceous-breasted amazon is 30 to 36 cm (12 to 14 in) long. It is mostly green, with red lores and forehead, a turquoise nape, and a lilac breast. Its carpal edge, speculum, and base of the outer tail feathers are red. Its primaries have blue to black ends. Its bill has a rosy pink to red base and a horn-colored tip. Its iris is red-orange to chestnut surrounded by pale gray skin and its legs and feet are gray.

== Distribution and habitat ==
The vinaceous-breasted amazon has a disjunct distribution. It is found in scattered locations generally from Brazil's São Paulo state south into Rio Grande do Sul, eastern Paraguay, and far northeastern Argentina's Misiones Province. It formerly occurred as far north as Bahia and south to Argentina's Corrientes Province. It inhabits a wide variety of landscapes within the Atlantic Forest biome but seems to concentrate in mixed forest with large amounts of paraná pine (Araucaria angustifolia). It also occurs in small forest patches, young secondary forest, pastures and grasslands with scattered trees, plantations of introduced pine and Eucalyptus, and around towns.

== Behavior ==
=== Movement ===
The vinaceous-breasted amazon does not seem to have a uniform pattern of migration. It is present in some areas only during the breeding season but is a year-round resident in others.

=== Feeding ===
The vinaceous-breasted amazon forages mostly in tree-tops and often in flocks. Seeds of paraná pine are a primary food source during winter but the species has been observed feeding on seeds, fruits, buds, and flowers of more than 30 plant species both native and introduced.

=== Breeding ===
The vinaceous-breasted amazon breeds mainly between August and December but the season may sometimes extend into March. It nests in tree cavities, some of them created by rot and others previously excavated by woodpeckers. The clutch size is two to four eggs. The female appears to do almost all of the incubation, which lasts about a month. Both parents provision nestlings; in captivity the time to fledging is about seven to 10 weeks after hatch.

=== Vocalization ===
The vinaceous-breasted amazon is usually silent at the nest and when foraging but highly vocal in flight and when perched away from the nest. Its typical call is described by one author as "'creo creo" or "crau crau", and by another as "wout-wout-" or "wi-rout wi-rout".

== Status ==
The IUCN originally assessed the vinaceous-breasted amazon in 1988 as Threatened, then in 1994 as Endangered, in 2004 as Vulnerable, and since 2009 again as Endangered. It has a very fragmented range and its estimated population of fewer than 2500 mature individuals is believed to be decreasing. Much of its habitat in the Atlantic Forest region has been cleared for timber, agriculture, and human settlement. It is a popular cage bird, and despite prohibitions, capture for the pet trade remains a threat. Large trees for nesting are scarce in some areas. Destruction of paraná pine seedlings by farmers and illegal harvest of their seeds threatens the parrot's primary winter food.

The vinaceous-breasted amazon's nesting is affected by competition from Africanized bees (Apis mellifera scutellata), an invasive species that has spread throughout South and Central America. It occupies potential nest cavities before the parrots can and sometimes takes over active nest cavities.
