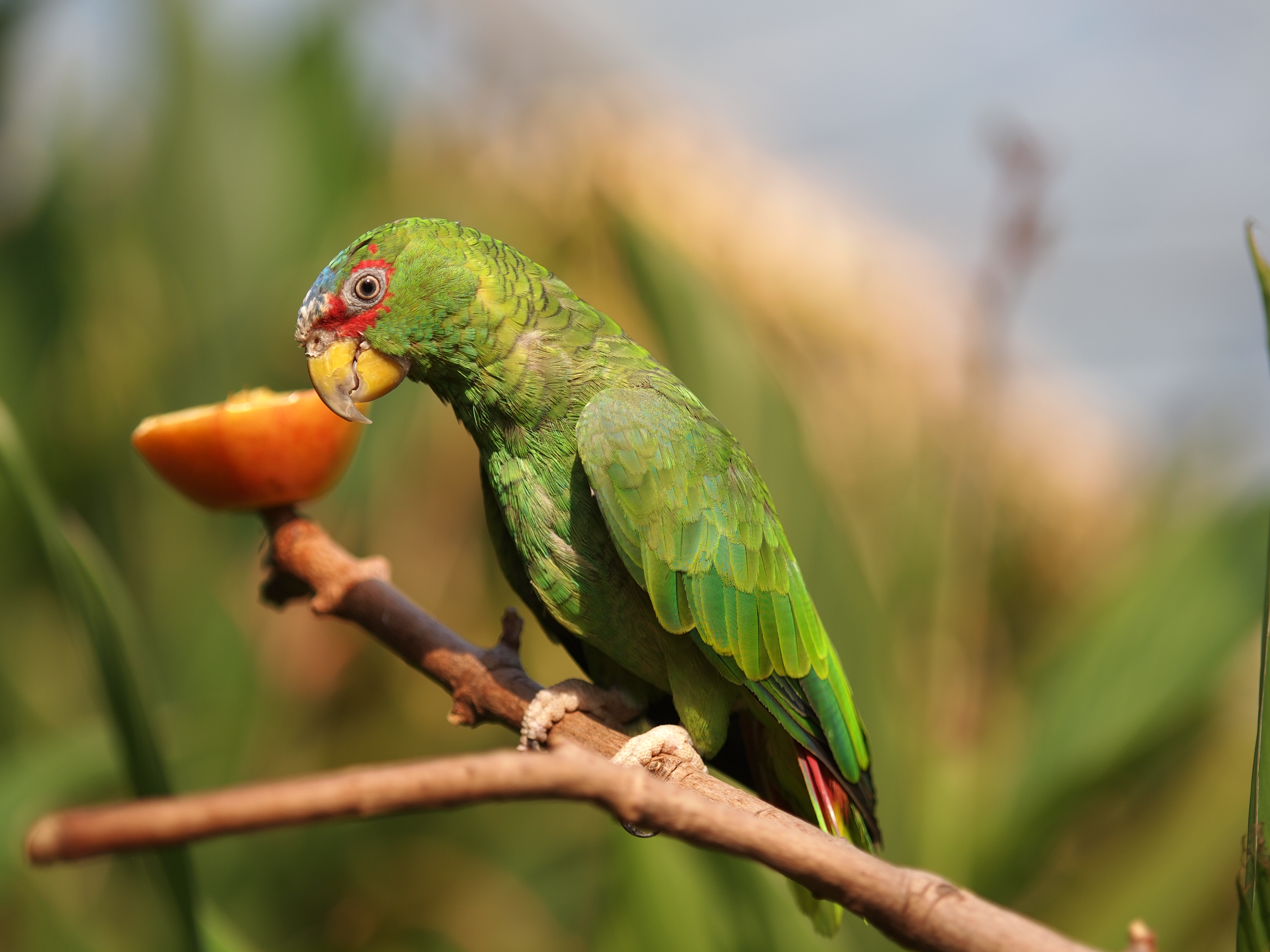

Conservation status
- Least Concern (IUCN 3.1)

Scientific classification
- Kingdom: Animalia
- Phylum: Chordata
- Class: Aves
- Order: Psittaciformes
- Family: Psittacidae
- Genus: Amazona
- Species: A. albifrons

Binomial name
- Amazona albifrons (Sparrman, 1788)

Subspecies
- A. a. albifrons A. a. saltuensis A. a. nana

= White-fronted amazon =

Species of bird

The white-fronted amazon (Amazona albifrons) also known as the white-fronted parrot, or spectacled amazon parrot, is a Central American species of parrot. They can imitate a range from 30 to 40 different sounds. Like other large parrots, the white-fronted parrot has a long potential life span, usually around 40 years.

== Description ==
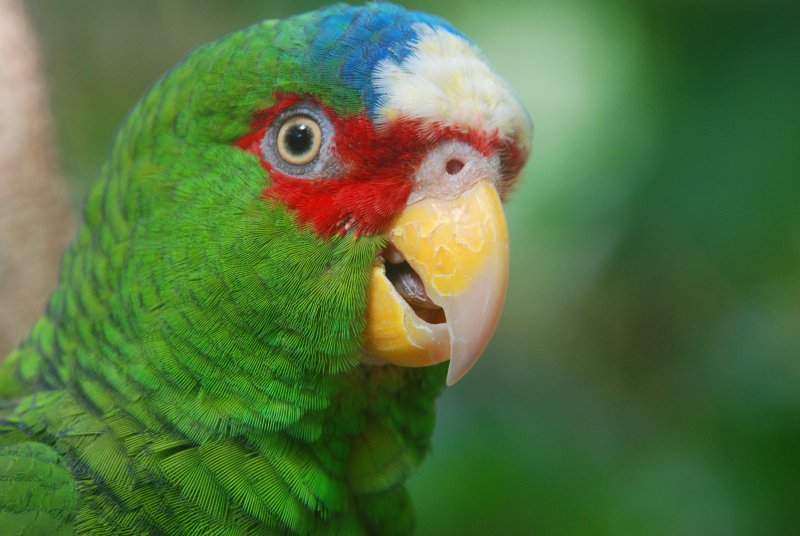
Upper body

The white-fronted amazon, at about 25 cm (9.8 in) long, is the smallest of the amazon parrots. This species is named for the bright white patch of feathers on its forehead, although the amount of white varies from individual to individual. They have mostly green plumage with some blue colouring on their outspread wings. They have bright red colouring around their eyes (in some individuals almost like spectacles) and blue colouring behind the patch of white on their foreheads. Together with the red-spectacled amazon and the yellow-lored amazon, it is the only amazon species in which adult males and females easily can be distinguished by external appearance (sexual dimorphism): Males have bright red feathers on their "shoulders" (alula), while females have green "shoulders". Juveniles have pale grey irises and less red on their face and the white area is replaced with a smaller yellowish area.

== Taxonomy ==
The species is divided into three subspecies with slight differences in colour and size:

- White-fronted amazon (A. a. albifrons) — (Sparrman, 1788) — nominate, found from western Mexico to southwestern Guatemala
- Lesser white-fronted amazon (A. a. nana) — Miller, W, 1905 — found from southeastern Mexico to northwestern Costa Rica
- Sonora white-fronted amazon (A. a. saltuensis) — Nelson, 1899 — found in northwestern Mexico

== Distribution and habitat ==
The white-fronted amazon is native to Central America and Mexico; and is most often seen in small flocks of up to 20 birds. They are seen in a variety of different habitats from wet regions such as rainforests, to drier areas such as cactus savannahs. In the wild, they are not shy and people are often able to approach them. Flocks may congregate and people have seen groups that number into the hundreds. These groups may also contain flocks from other species such as the red-lored amazon. A population has been seen in southern Texas, probably escapees, and a small feral population has been observed living in southern California. Introduced breeding populations have also been reported in Puerto Rico.

== Breeding ==
The white-fronted amazon nests in tree cavities. Their breeding season is usually in the spring, starting in February and ending in the summer (in June and July in most areas). After breeding, the female will lay an average of three to four white eggs. Eggs are incubated for about 26 days and chicks leave the nest at the age of about 60 days from hatching.

== Aviculture ==
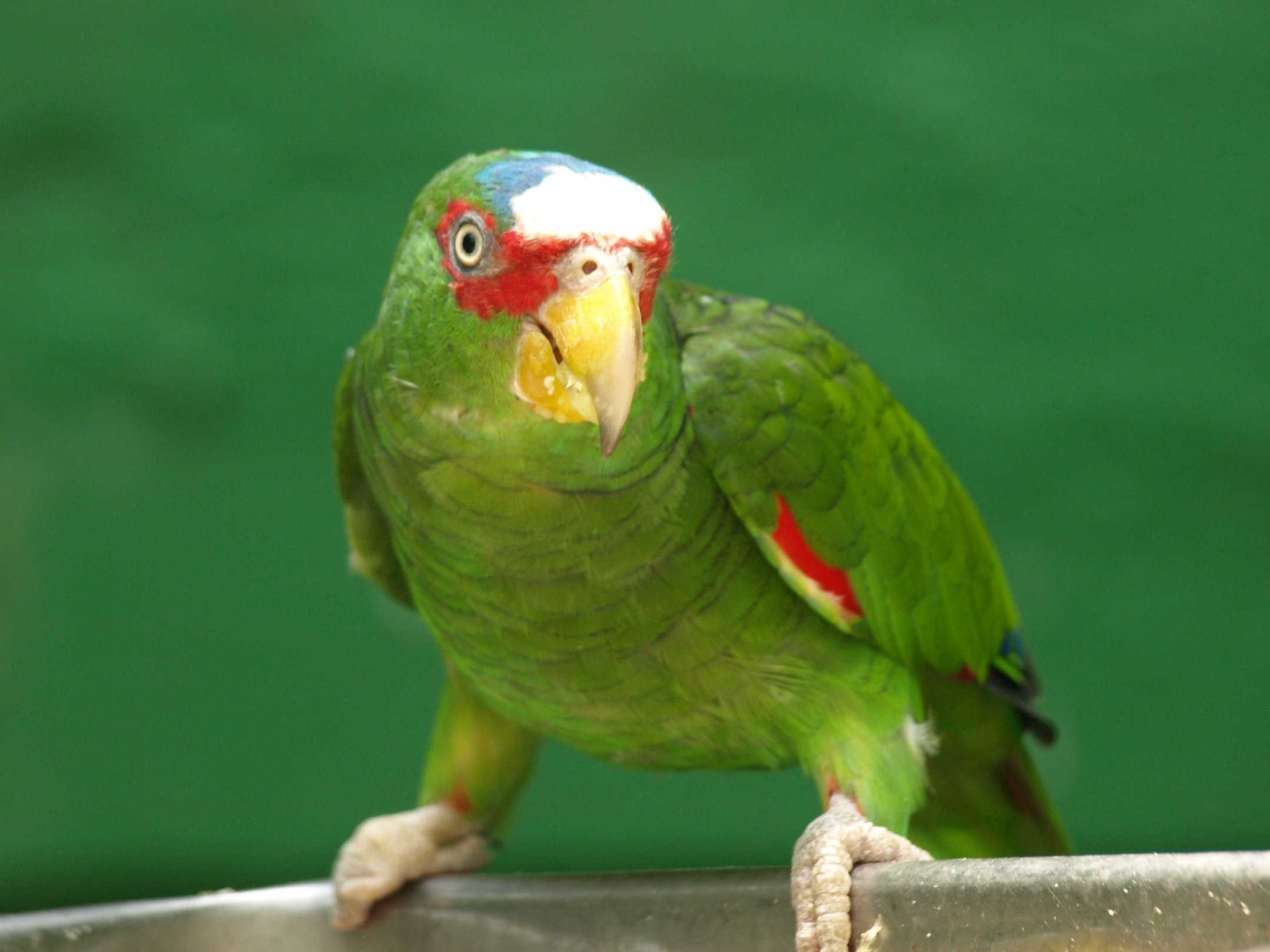
Pet

The white-fronted amazon is sometimes kept by humans as a companion parrot or aviary bird. When tame, it is typically a sociable, affectionate, playful and intelligent bird that can learn to talk and often forms a close bond with its owner. Like many parrots, it is a long-lived species - potentially living for over 50 years in captivity. However it is also a loud, noisy bird that is unsuitable for apartment dwelling and requires regular exercise, play opportunities and social interaction in order to thrive. The World Parrot Trust recommends that the white-fronted amazon be kept in an enclosure with a minimum length of 3 metres.

== Gallery ==
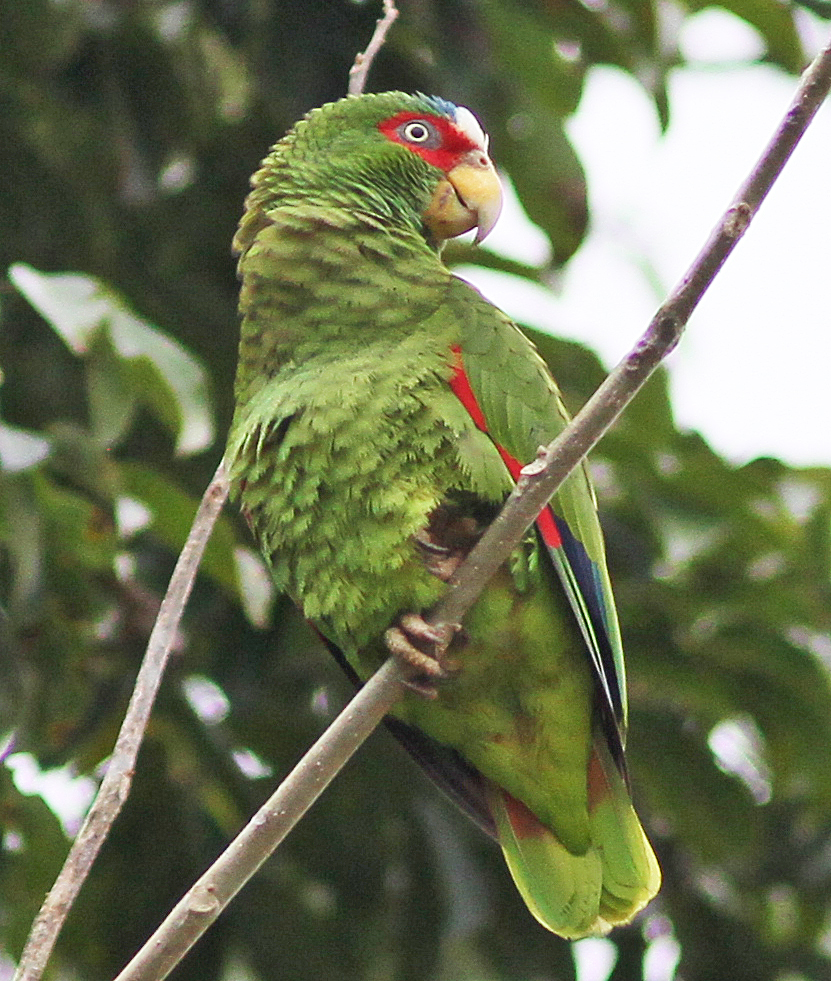
Tikal, Guatemala

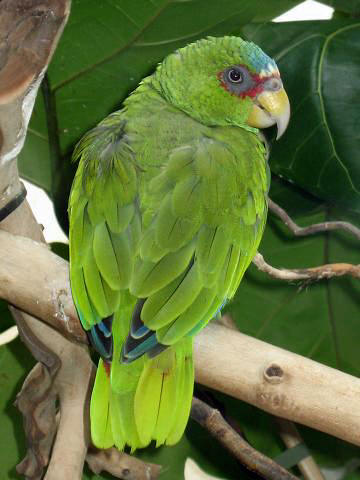
Juvenile

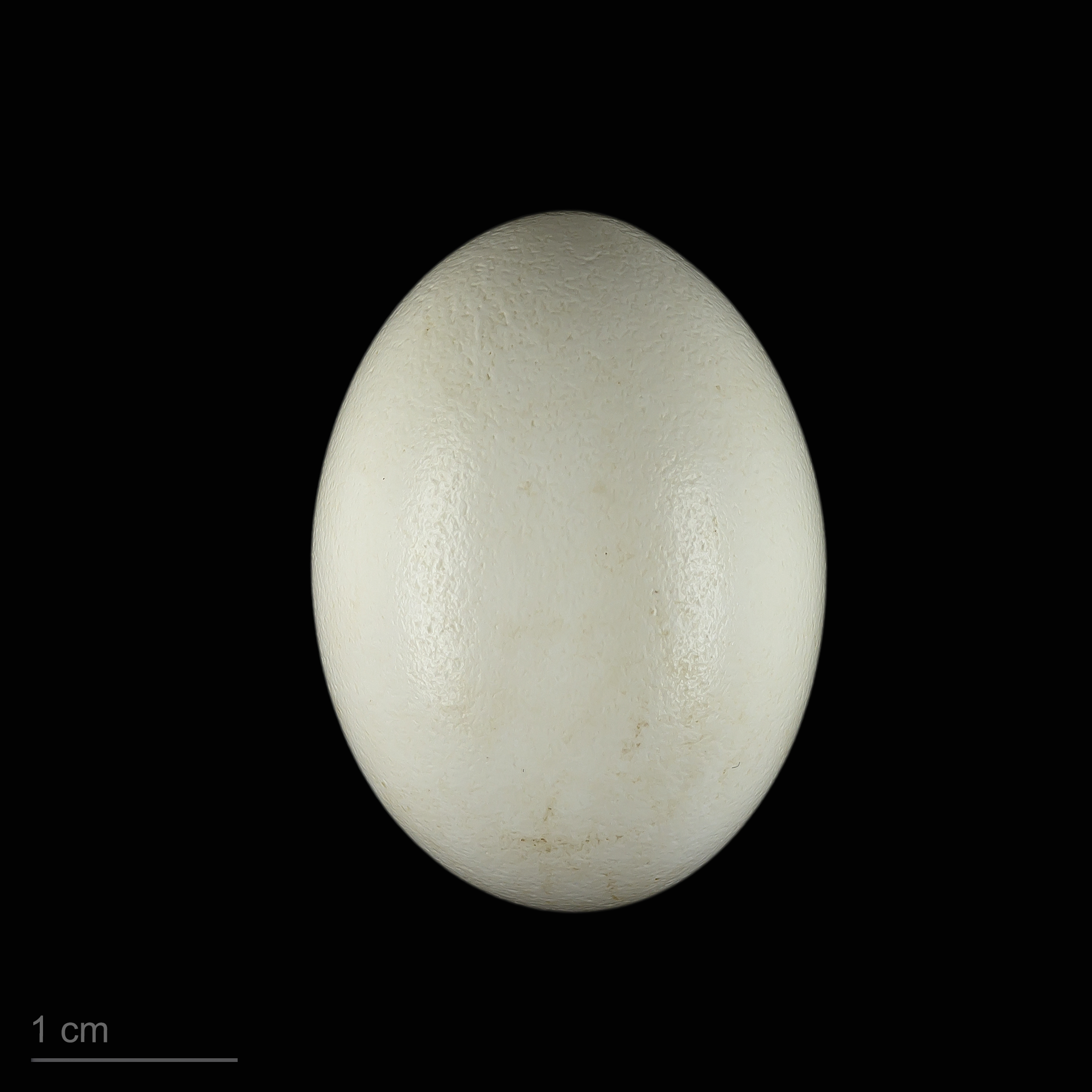
Amazona albifrons egg - MHNT
