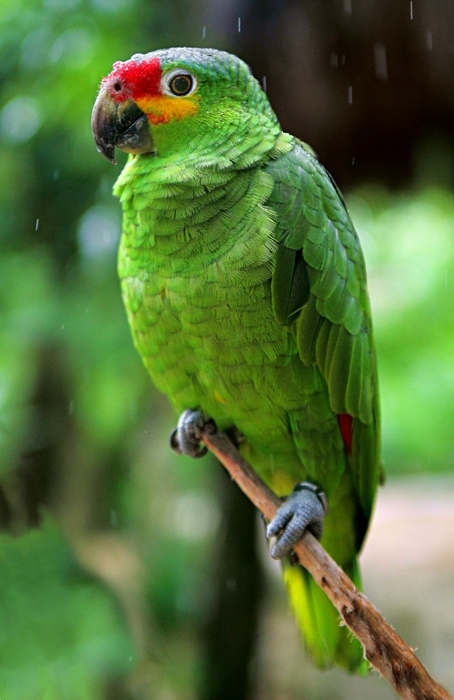
- At Xcaret Eco Park, Mexico

Conservation status
- Least Concern (IUCN 3.1)

Scientific classification
- Kingdom: Animalia
- Phylum: Chordata
- Class: Aves
- Order: Psittaciformes
- Family: Psittacidae
- Genus: Amazona
- Species: A. autumnalis

Binomial name
- Amazona autumnalis (Linnaeus, 1758)

Synonyms
- Psittacus autumnalis Linnaeus, 1758

= Red-lored amazon =

Species of bird

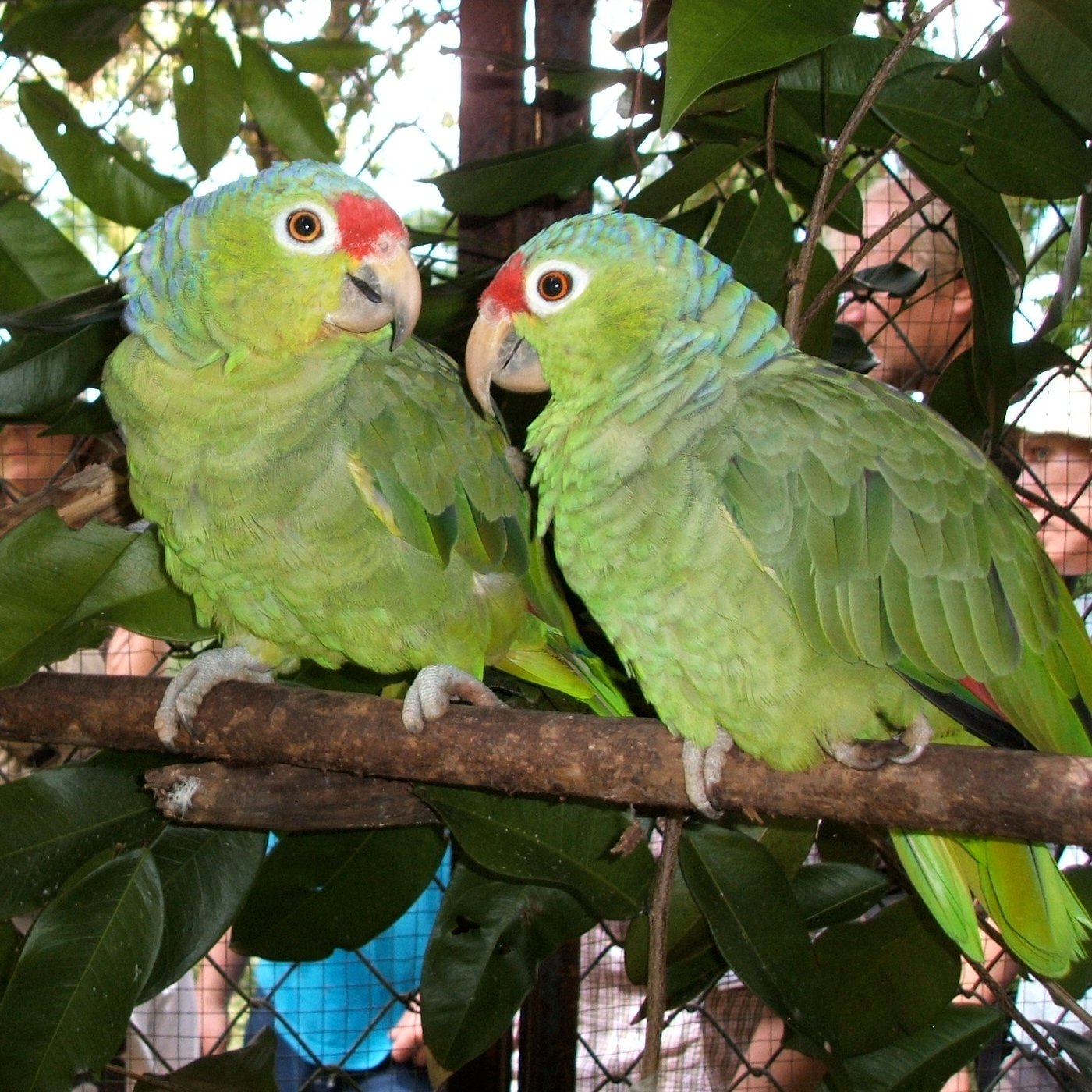
A. a. salvini at Cana Blanca Wildlife Sanctuary, Costa Rica

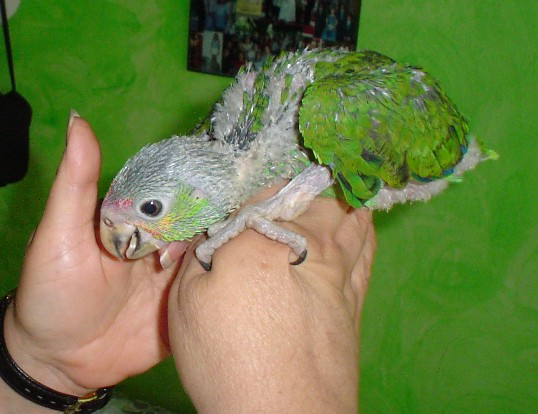
A captive-bred red-lored parrot chick at the age of 6 weeks

The red-lored amazon or red-lored parrot (Amazona autumnalis) is a species of amazon parrot, native to tropical regions of the Americas, from eastern Mexico south to Ecuador where it occurs in humid evergreen to semi-deciduous forests up to 1,100 m altitude. It is absent from the Pacific side of Central America north of Costa Rica. Not originally known from El Salvador, a pair - perhaps escaped from captivity - nested successfully in 1995 and 1996 in the outskirts of San Salvador and the species might expand its range permanently into that country in the future. This species has also established feral populations in several California cities.

== Taxonomy ==
The red-lored amazon was formally described in 1758 by the Swedish naturalist Carl Linnaeus in the tenth edition of his Systema Naturae. He placed it with all the other parrots in the genus Psittacus and coined the binomial name Psittacus autumnalis. Linnaeus based his description on the "lesser green parrot" that had been described and illustrated in 1751 by the English naturalist George Edwards in the fourth volume of his A Natural History of Uncommon Birds. Edwards mistakenly believed his specimen had come from the West Indies. The type locality was later designated as southern Mexico. The red-lored amazon is now one of around thirty species placed in the genus Amazona that was introduced by the French naturalist René Lesson in 1830. The genus name is a Latinized version of the name Amazone used in the 18th century by the Comte de Buffon. The specific epithet autumnalis is Latin for "autumnal".

Two subspecies are recognised:

- A. a. autumnalis (Linnaeus, C, 1758) – Caribbean slope of eastern Mexico to northern Nicaragua and Bay Islands
- A. a. salvini (Salvadori, AT, 1891) – northern Nicaragua southward to northwestern Ecuador (south to northern Manabí) and far northwestern Venezuela (Zulia)

The lilacine amazon (Amazona lilacina) and the diademed amazon (Amazona diadema) were previously considered to be conspecific with the red-lored amazon.

== Description ==
The red-lored amazon is 32–35 centimetres (13–14 in) in length, with a weight of 310–480 g. The plumage is primarily green, with a red forehead and, in some subspecies, yellow cheeks (sometimes with red spots). The crown is blue. Adult males and females do not differ in plumage. Juveniles have less yellow on the cheeks, less red on the forehead, and dark irises.

== Behavior ==
=== Food and feeding ===
Their food includes fruits, nuts and seeds. Like all parrots, red-lored amazons need a varied diet consisting of high quality pellets, a quality seed mix, and daily servings of fresh, bird-safe fruits and vegetables.

=== Breeding ===
The red-lored amazon nests in tree cavities. The eggs are white and there are usually three or four in a clutch. The female incubates the eggs for about 26 days and the chicks leave the nest about 60 days after hatching.

== Status ==
In some areas, notably parts of Mexico and Venezuela, the red-lored amazon has become rare through trapping for the cagebird trade. On the other hand, it seems to be able to adapt to human-altered habitat to a considerable degree.

== Aviculture ==
Red-lored amazons are fairly common pet parrots in the Americas. They can be devoted pets and some make fairly good talkers. Like most amazon parrots they often have a tendency to vocalize loudly, and sometimes to bite. Their behavior ranges from being quiet and curious to being aggressive, this can all be changed by basic training when the bird is of a young age. Red-lored amazons can grow up to 13 inches in length. While they largely feast on seeds, fruits and nuts, avocados and eggplants are poisonous to them and can kill them. Their average life span is up to 80 years.

== Gallery ==
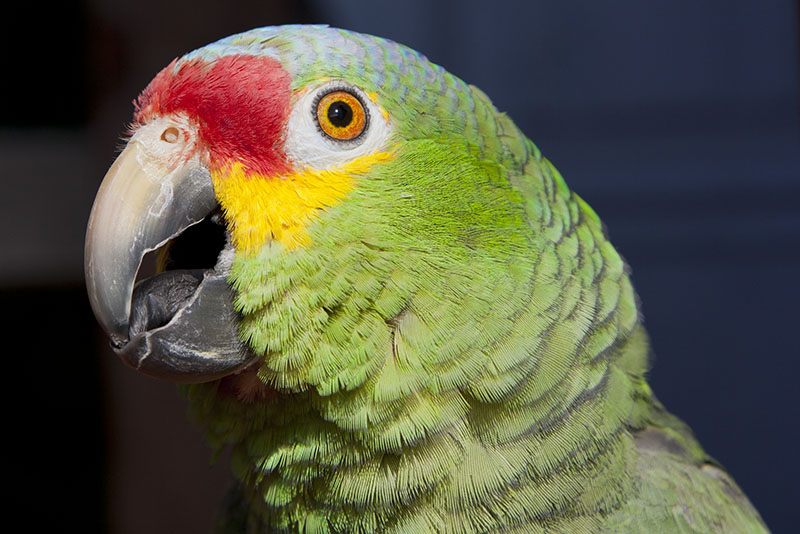
Vocalizing

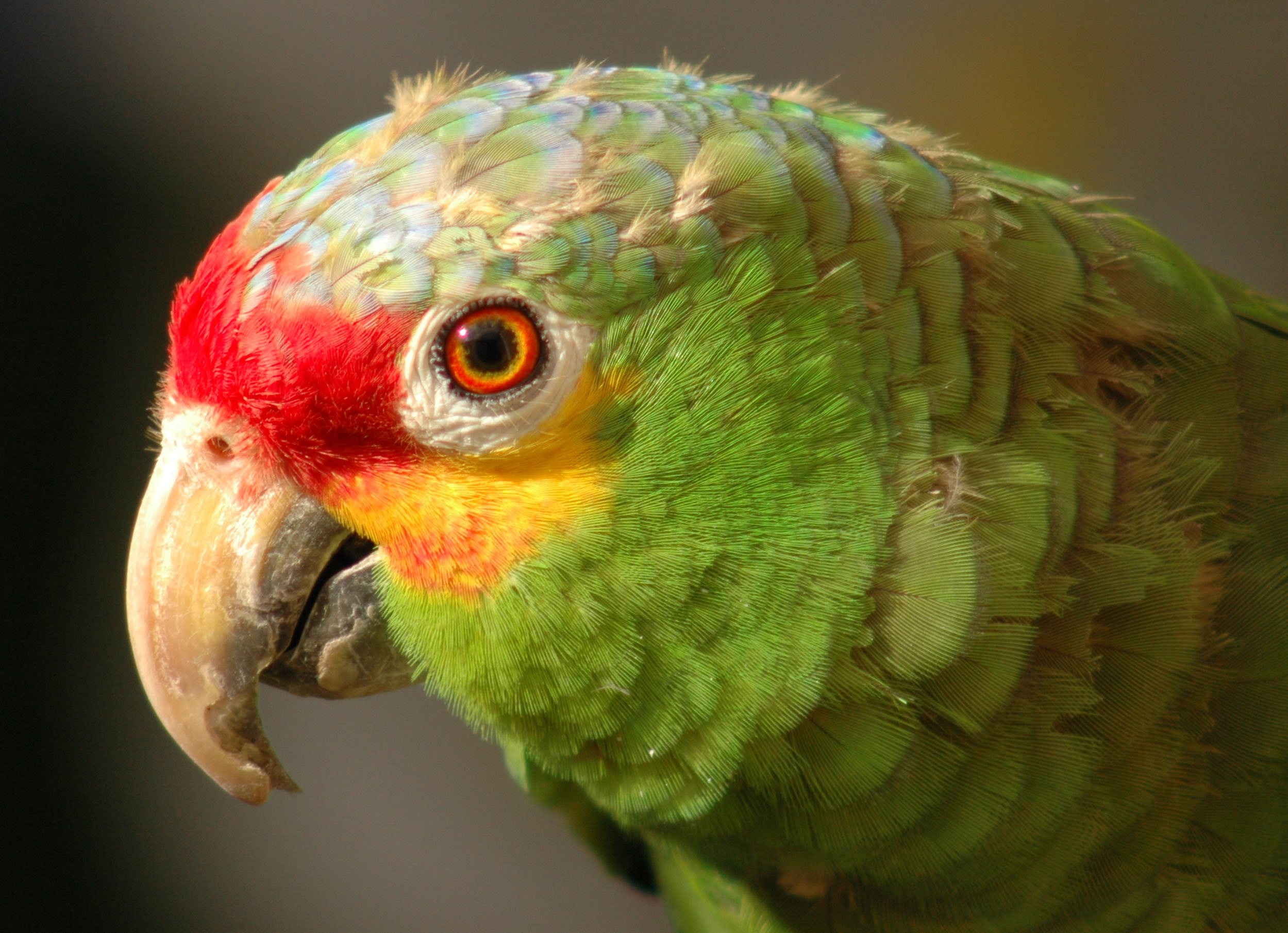
Head plumage of adults is characteristic, but the cheek color varies among subspecies, with this, A. a. autumnalis, being the only with a bright yellow patch

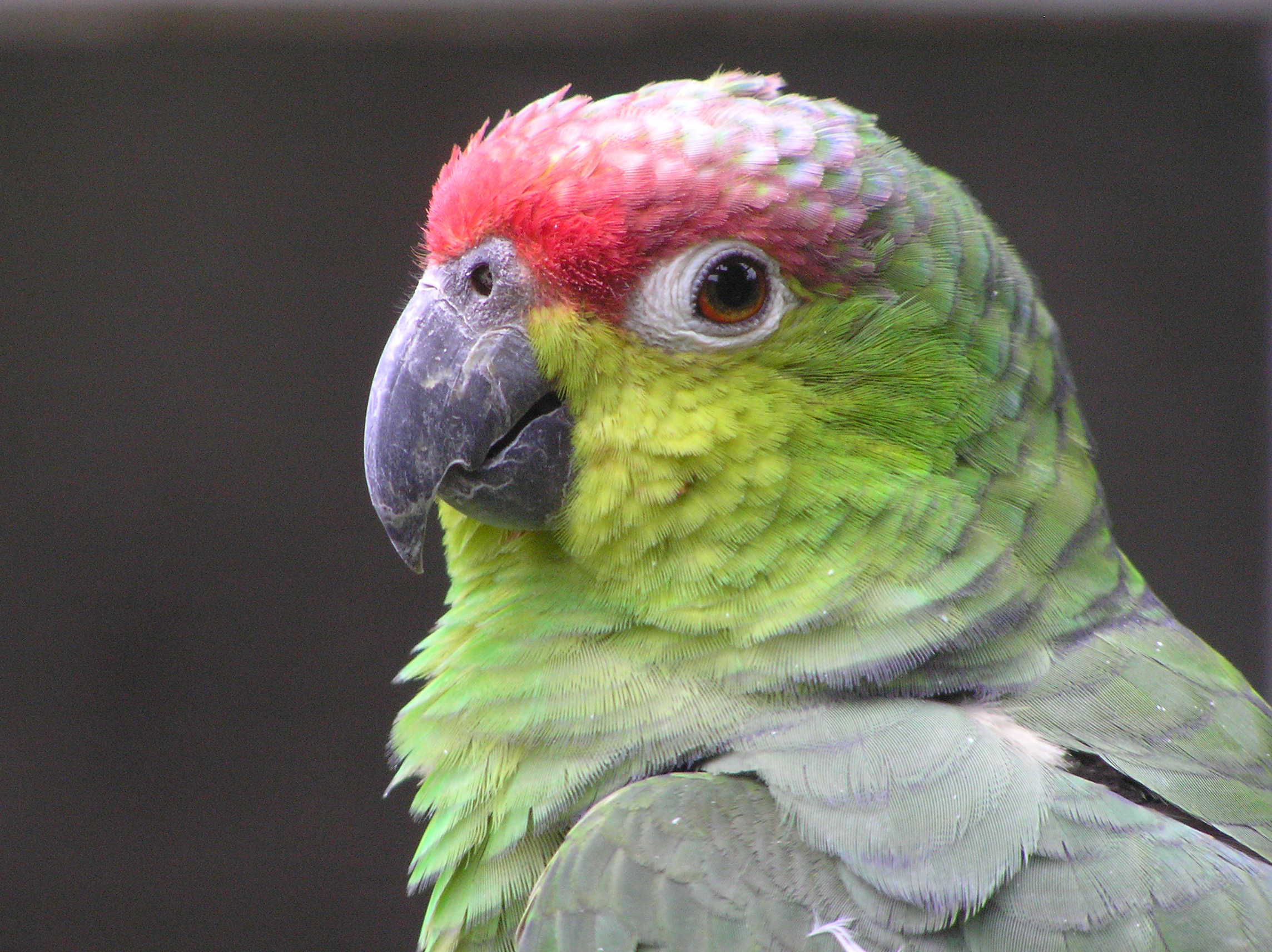
A. a. lilacina is local within its already small range, leading to concerns about its status

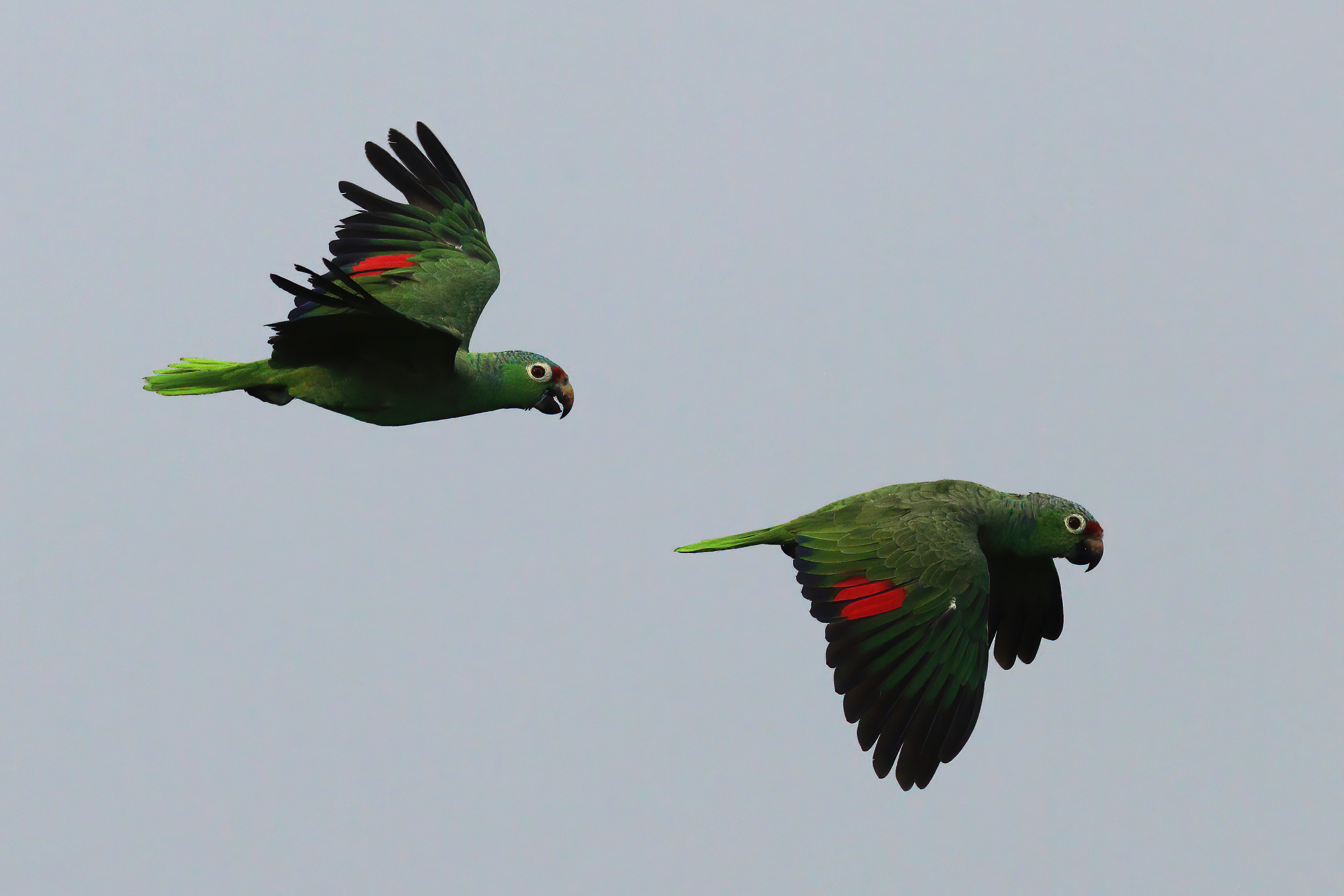
A. a. salvini in flight, Panama

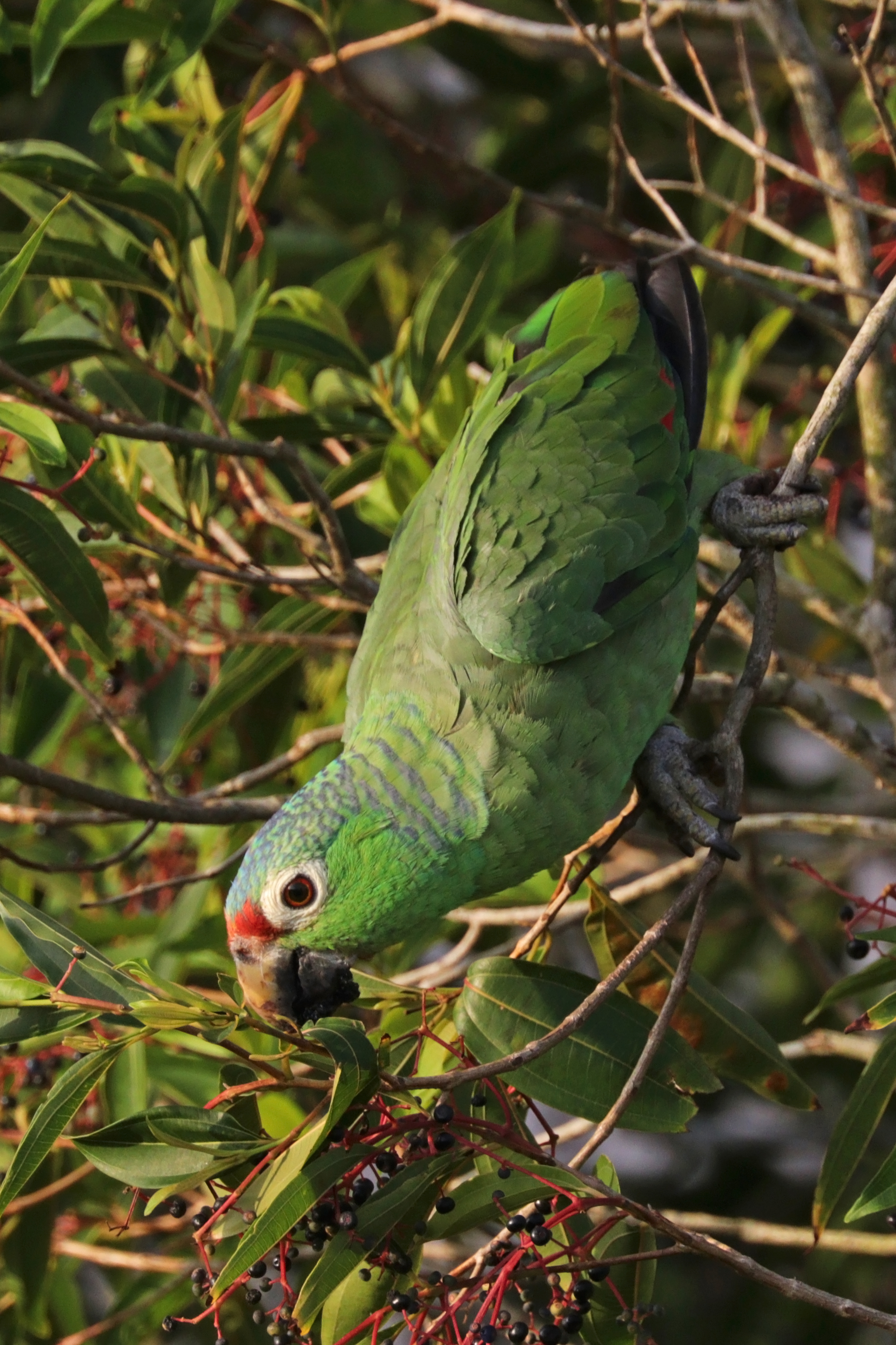
A. a. salvini feeding in the wild, Panama

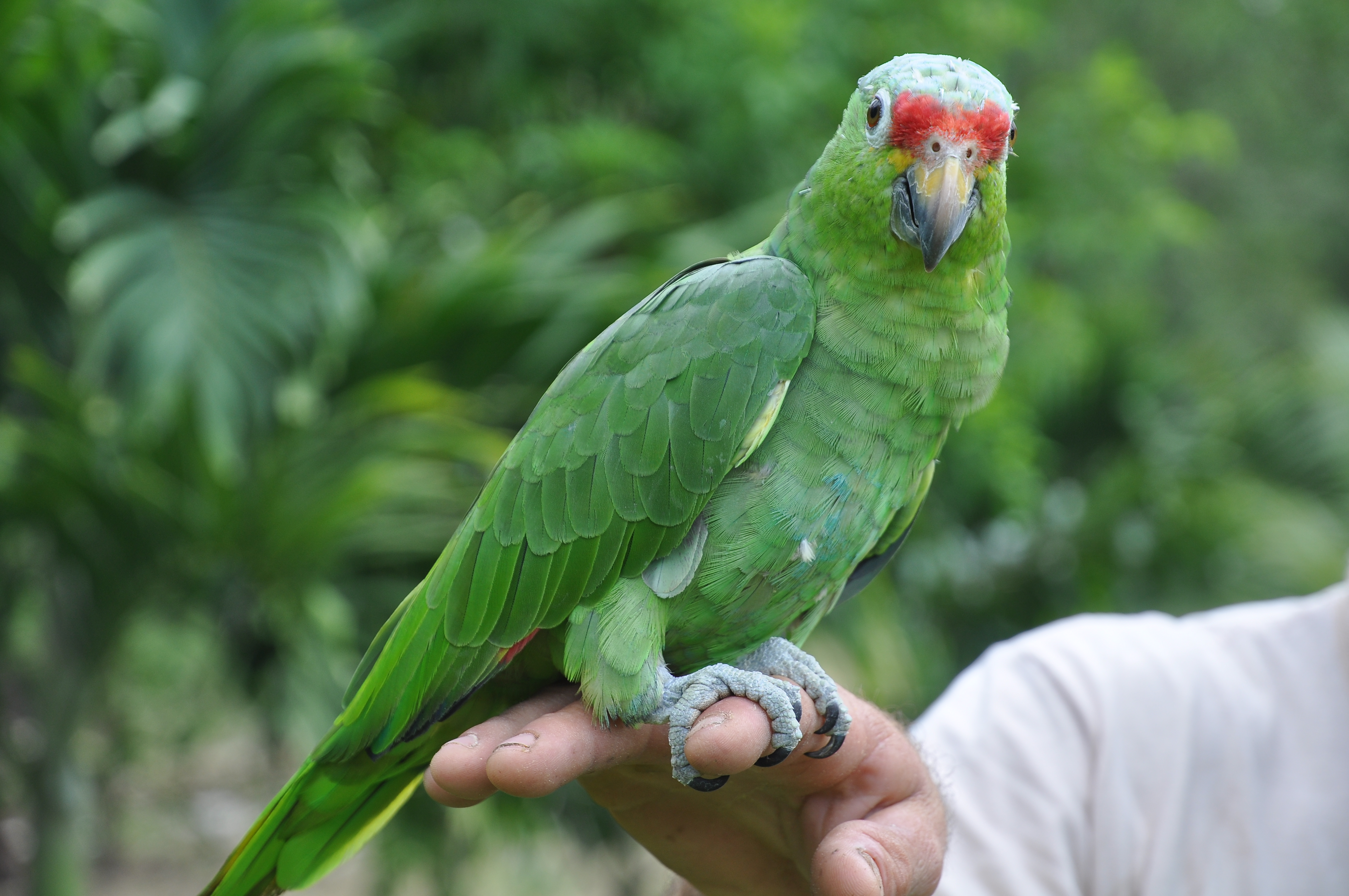
A pet juvenile in Costa Rica
