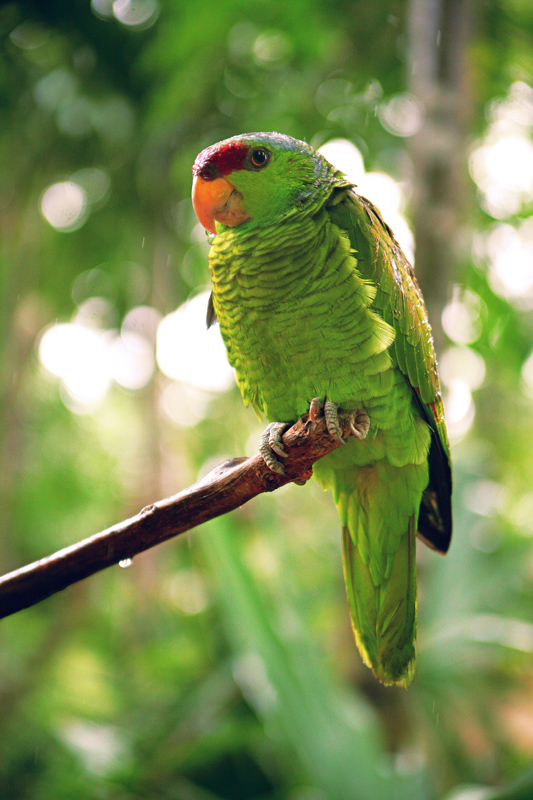
- At Xcaret Eco Park, Mexico

Conservation status
- Endangered (IUCN 3.1)
- CITES Appendix I

Scientific classification
- Kingdom: Animalia
- Phylum: Chordata
- Class: Aves
- Order: Psittaciformes
- Family: Psittacidae
- Genus: Amazona
- Species: A. finschi

Binomial name
- Amazona finschi (Sclater, PL, 1864)

= Lilac-crowned amazon =

Species of bird

The lilac-crowned amazon (Amazona finschi), also known as the lilac-crowned parrot, Finsch's parrot or Finsch's amazon, is a parrot endemic to the Pacific slopes of Mexico. Also known as Finsch's amazon, it is characterised by green plumage, a maroon forehead, and a violet-blue crown and neck.

In 2006, BirdLife International classified this species as vulnerable. In 2014, IUCN uplisted this species to Endangered.

The species name of this bird, finschi, commemorates the German naturalist and explorer Otto Finsch.

== Description ==
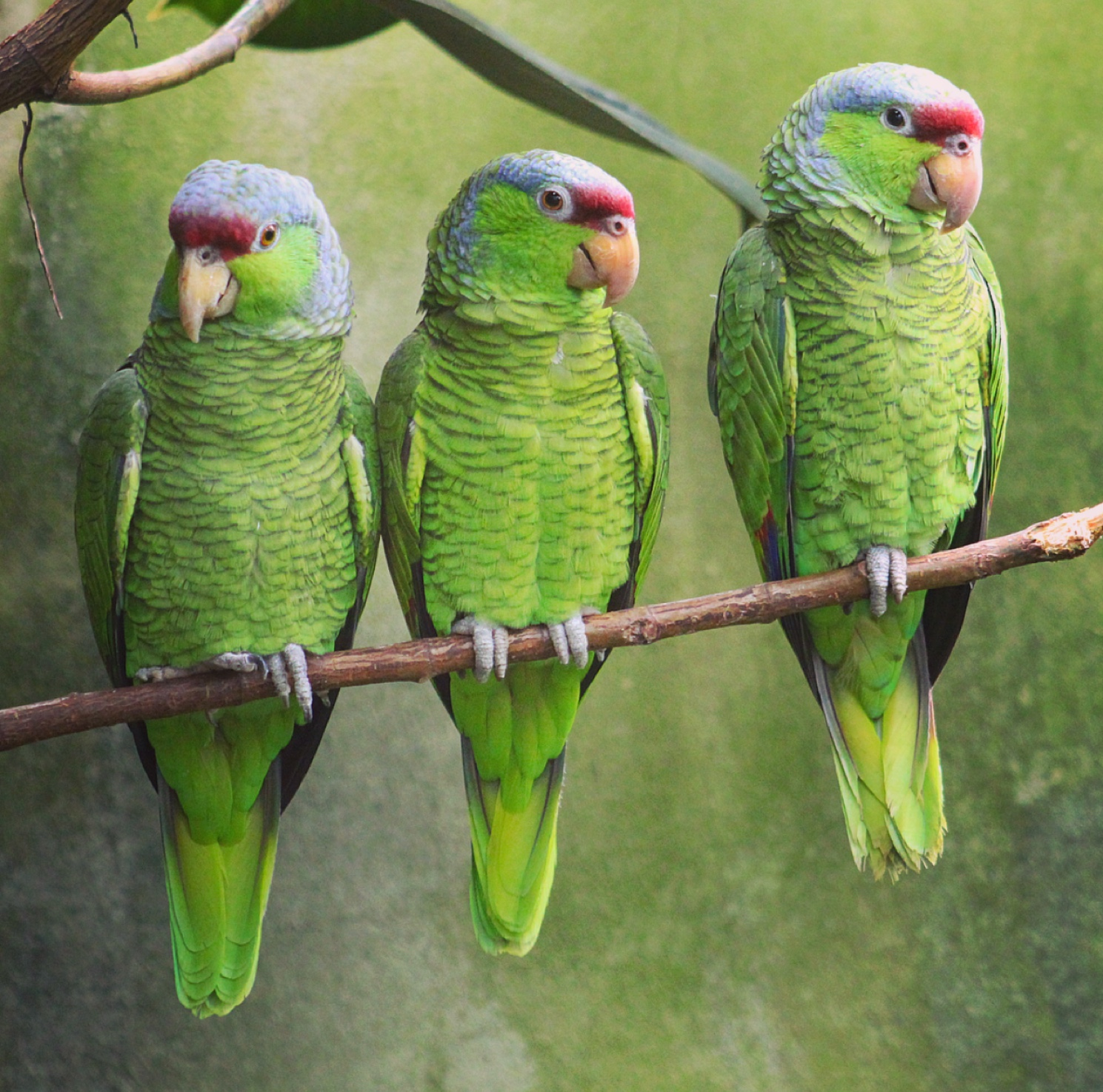
Lilac-crowned amazons in a U.S. Zoo

The plumage of an adult lilac-crowned amazon is primarily green with yellowish underparts and black edging. The forehead is a maroon colour with a light blue-lilac neck, nape, and crown. The cheeks and ear coverts are a greenish yellow that lacks the edging that is present in most of the plumage. The primary feathers are dark blue with the secondary feathers being green while being tipped with the same dark blue colouring. Furthermore, the initial five secondary feathers have a bright red speculum on the edge of the feathers. The wing coverts, the underside of the flight feathers, and the tail are green while the tail is tipped with a yellowish colouring similar to that of the cheeks and ear coverts. Their beak, orbital rings, and legs are a pale brown-grey colouring. The irides of adult lilac-crowned parrots are amber-coloured.

Juvenile lilac-crowned amazons are visually similar to their adult forms except for minor differences. One difference is that the iris of juveniles is a dark brown as opposed to the amber colouring that is found in adults. The other major difference is that there less maroon coloured feathers on the forehead of juveniles. After about one-year juveniles begin to acquire these adult features.

== Range and habitat ==
The lilac-crowned amazon's endemic range spans along the pacific coast of Mexico, beginning in southeastern Sonora and southwestern Chihuahua down to southern Oaxaca. In Sinaloa and northern Nayarit the geographic range of the lilac-crowned parrot is above 375 meters of elevation; the range does not descend to sea level until southern Nayarit, where it remains so through Jalisco and Oaxaca.

The lilac-crowned amazon's natural habitat in Mexico is often threatened. The decline in population size has been recorded in almost all of its natural habitat locations. Based on a collection of data and resident accounts, Amazona finschi population range has decreased by 20% due to habitat loss.

An increasingly growing population of approximately 100 individuals is found in Southern California, especially in the San Gabriel Valley and Orange Country. This increase could also be attributed to a more reliable source of measurement of population than in past years. These populations often are found in residential areas and occasionally in nesting groups with red-crowned parrots in native conifer forests or non-native captive plants.

== Breeding ==
The lilac-crowned amazon's breeding season is from February to June. They have a 28 day incubation period and a 60 day period of nestling growth. They tend to nest in the natural cavities of trees in dry forests. Females have a clutch size ranging from 1–4 eggs which usually results in an average brood size of 1.8 nestlings and a reproductive output of 0.99 fledglings per egg-laying female. Ultimately outcomes of reproductive efforts result in 0.70 independent young per egg-laying pair.

These low success rates could be attributed to the climate variability in dry forests, which could have an effect on clutch size, reproductive output and success.
