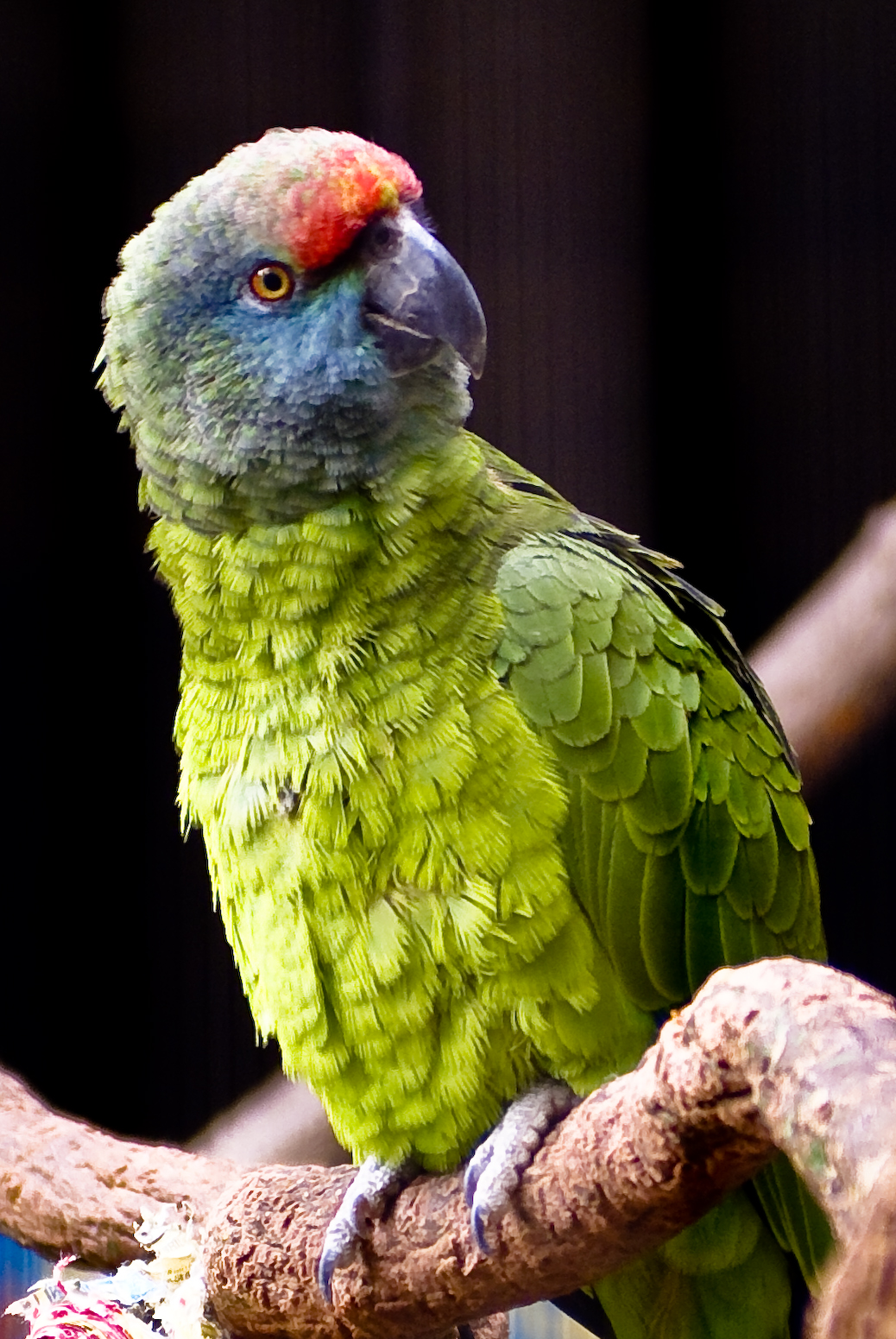
- A. f. bodini

Conservation status
- Least Concern (IUCN 3.1)

Scientific classification
- Kingdom: Animalia
- Phylum: Chordata
- Class: Aves
- Order: Psittaciformes
- Family: Psittacidae
- Genus: Amazona
- Species: A. festiva

Binomial name
- Amazona festiva (Linnaeus, 1758)

Synonyms
- Chrysotis chloronota; Psittacus festivus Linnaeus, 1758

= Festive amazon =

Species of bird

The festive amazon (Amazona festiva), also known as the festive parrot, is a species of parrot in the family Psittacidae. It is found in Brazil, Colombia, Ecuador, Bolivia, Guyana, Peru, and Venezuela. It is associated with forest (especially Várzea) and woodland growing near major rivers. Locally, it is also found in coastal mangroves (primarily in Amapá). There are two subspecies; A. f. festiva and A. f. bodini.

== Taxonomy ==
The festive amazon was formally described in 1758 by the Swedish naturalist Carl Linnaeus, in the tenth edition of his Systema Naturae. He placed it with all the other parrots in the genus Psittacus and coined the binomial name Psittacus festivus. Linnaeus mistakenly specified the type location as "Indies". It was later designated as the Amazon River in Brazil. The festive amazon is now one of around thirty species placed in the genus Amazona that was introduced by the French naturalist René Lesson in 1830. The genus name is a Latinized version of the name Amazone used in the 18th century by the Comte de Buffon. The specific epithet festivus is Latin for "festive" or "cheerful".

Two subspecies are recognised:

- A. f. bodini (Finsch, 1873) – east Colombia, east Venezuela, Guyana
- A. f. festiva (Linnaeus, 1758) – west Amazonia

== Description ==
The subspecies bodini has more red to the forecrown and more blue to the face than the nominate. In flight, both subspecies show deep blue outer wings (outer webs of the primaries and the primary coverts) and a red rump, but the latter is reduced in juveniles.

== Distribution and habitat ==
The nominate subspecies is found near rivers in the Amazon Basin, while the subspecies bodini, is found near the Orinoco River.

== Status ==
Although it has declined locally, it remains fairly common throughout a large part of its range and can even be seen near cities such as Manaus and Iquitos. Consequently, it was considered to be of least concern by BirdLife International and IUCN, though it was uplisted to vulnerable in 2012, due to models of deforestation in the Amazon Rainforest and its susceptibility to hunting, which predicts that the population will decline rapidly over the next three generations.

== Gallery ==
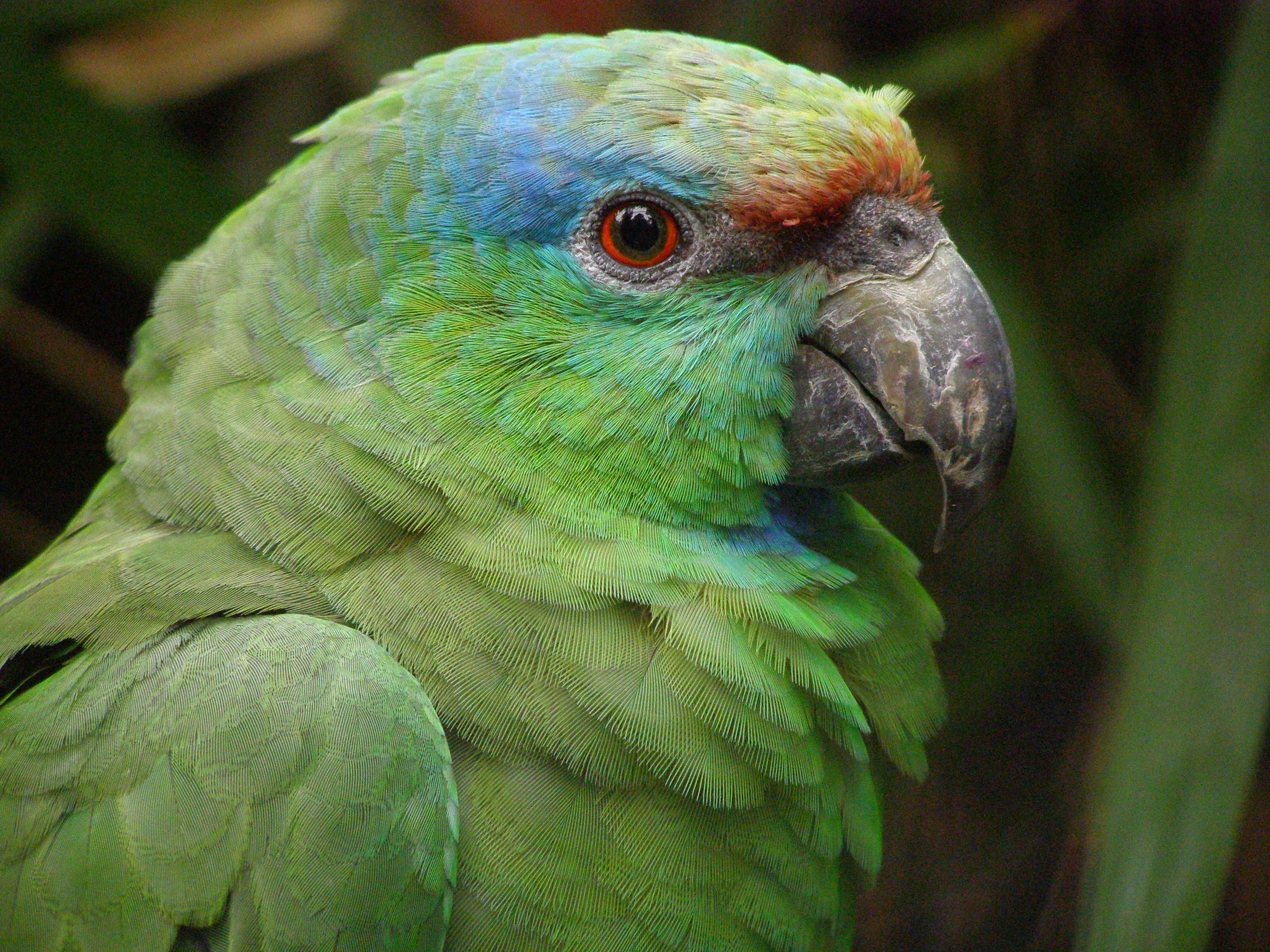
Amazona f. festiva

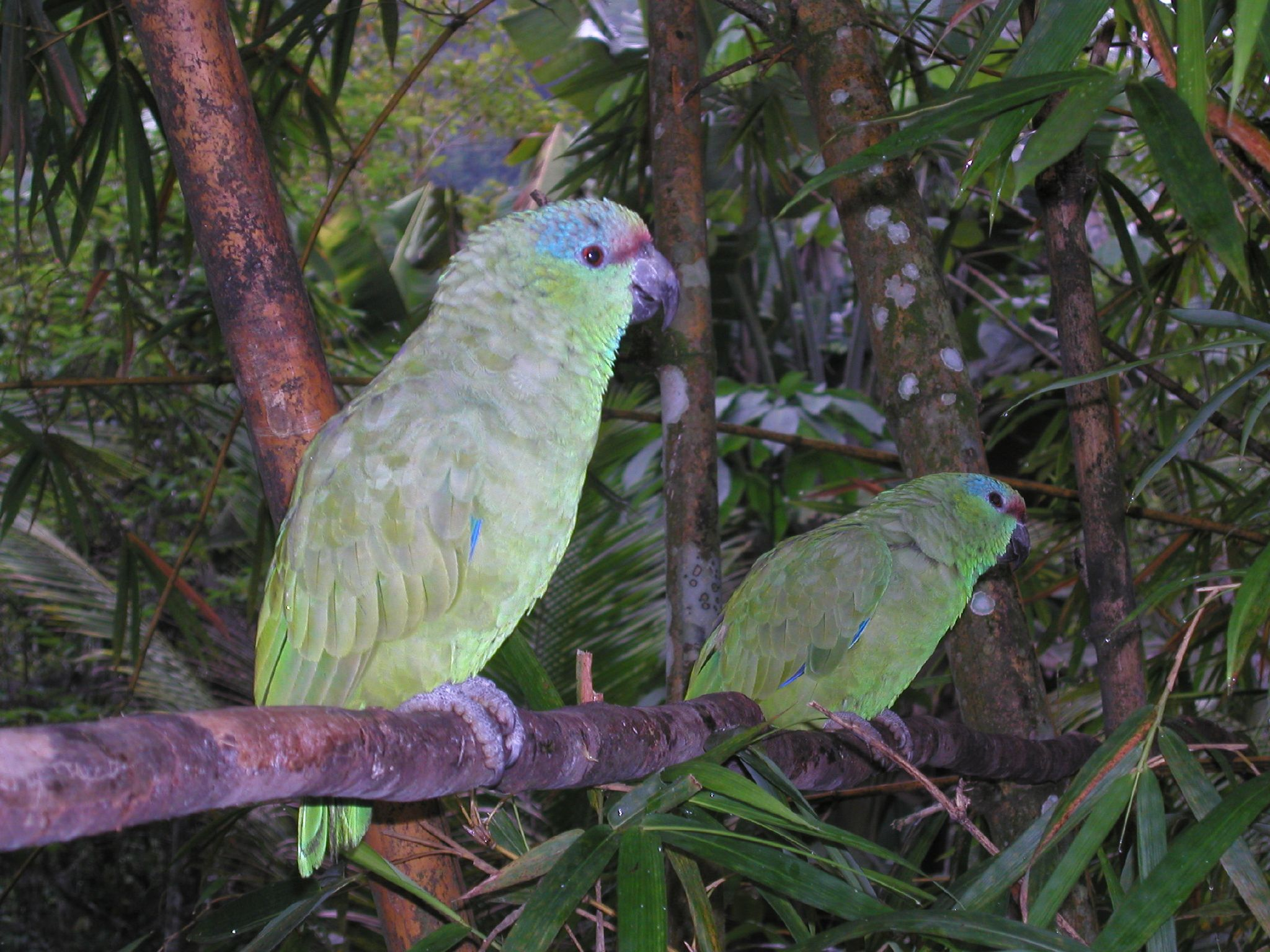
A. f. festiva in the Amazon Jungle

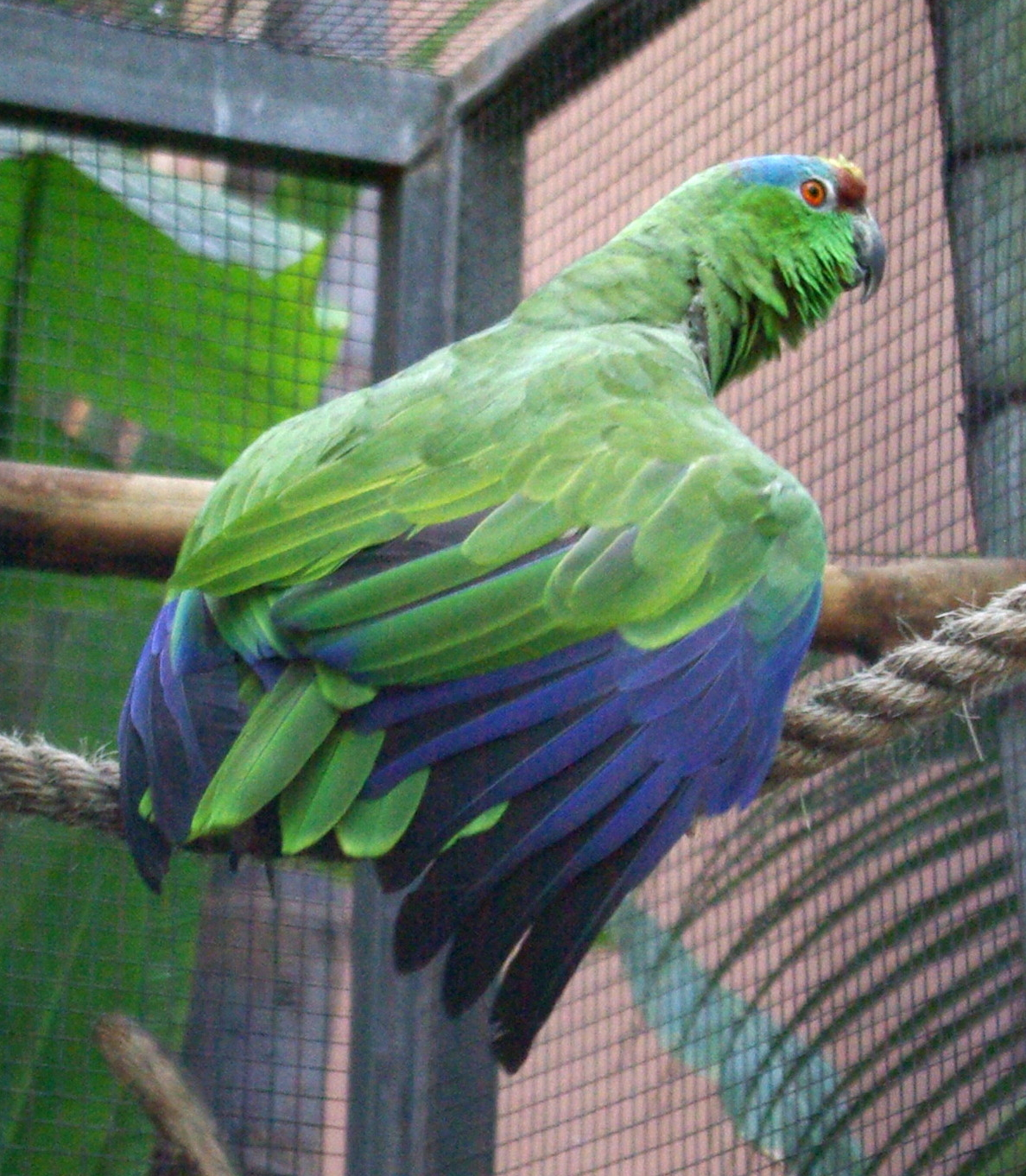
At Loro Park.

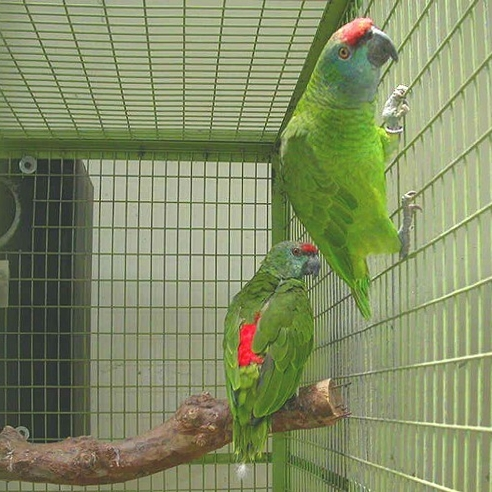
A. f. bodini adults have a red back

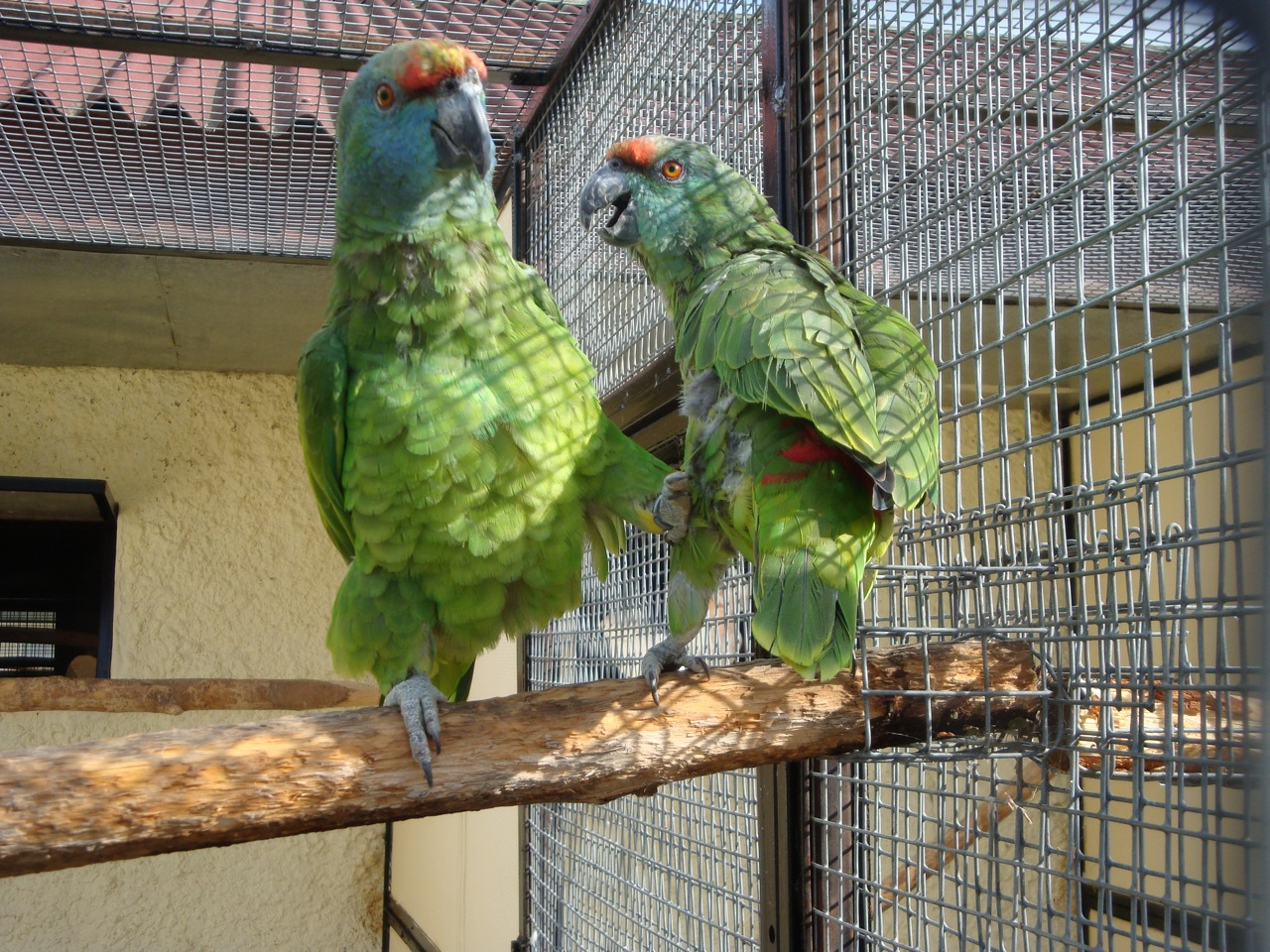
A. f. bodini in an aviary
