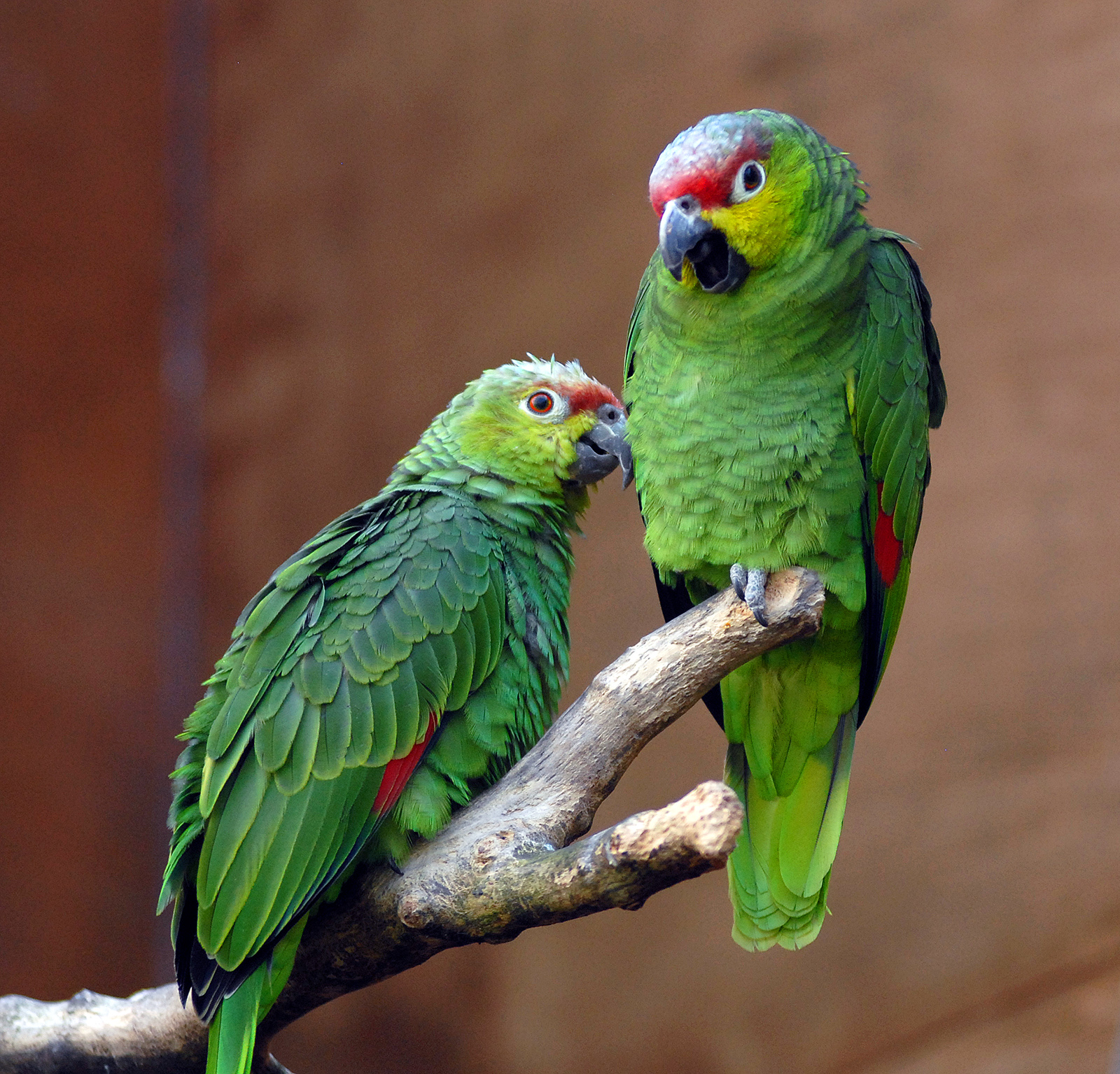
- At Chester Zoo, Cheshire

Conservation status
- Critically Endangered (IUCN 3.1)

Scientific classification
- Kingdom: Animalia
- Phylum: Chordata
- Class: Aves
- Order: Psittaciformes
- Family: Psittacidae
- Genus: Amazona
- Species: A. lilacina

Binomial name
- Amazona lilacina Lesson, 1844

Synonyms
- Chrysotis lilacina; Amazona lilacina

= Lilacine amazon =

Subspecies of bird

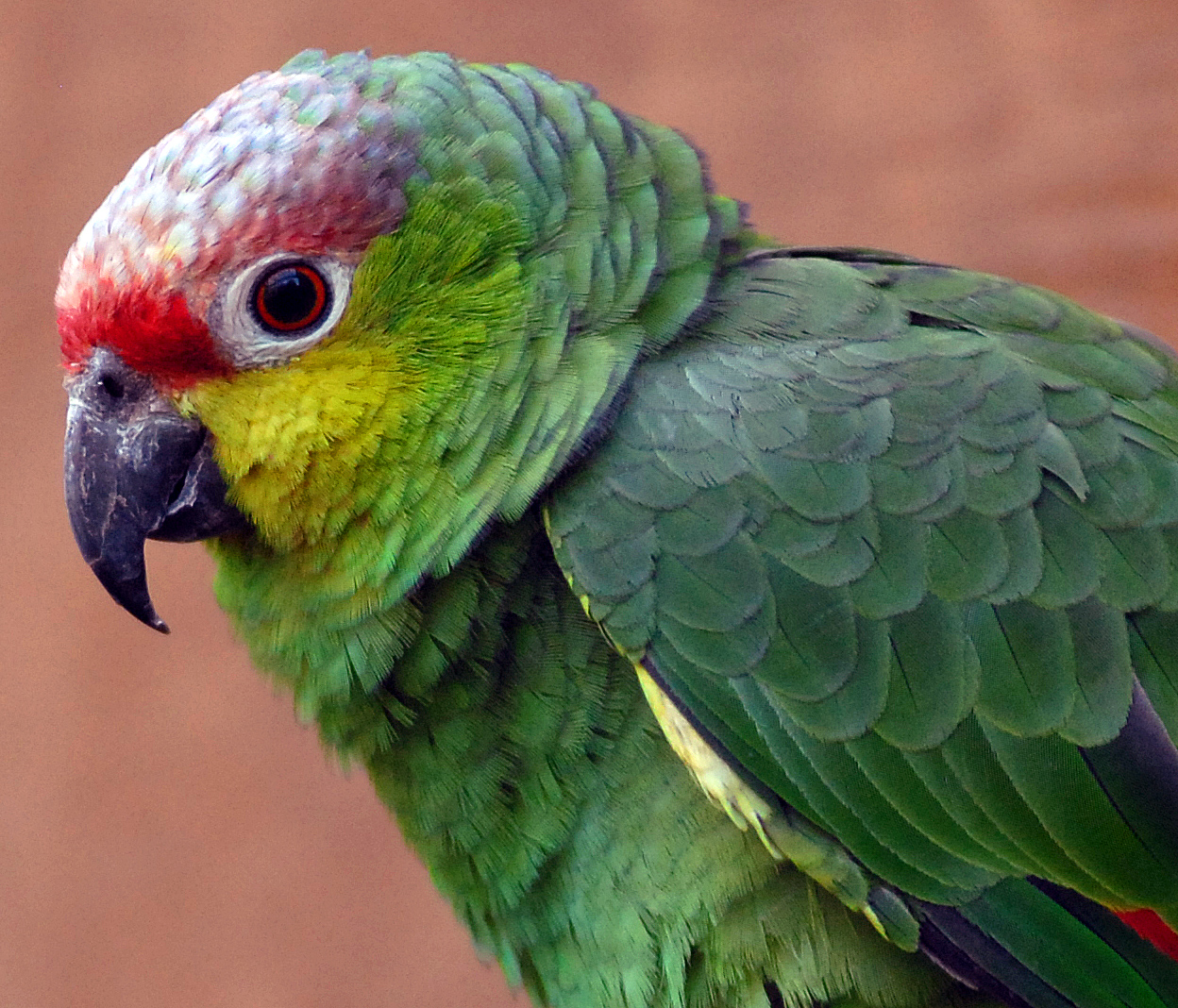
At Chester Zoo

The lilacine amazon (Amazona lilacina), also known as the Ecuadorian red-lored amazon, is an amazon parrot native to Ecuador in South America. The International Union for Conservation of Nature classifies the lilacine amazon as critically endangered.

It is generally smaller than the closely related red-lored amazon, with a black beak and more subdued coloring. Lilacine amazons are said to make favorable companion parrots because of their gentle, affectionate nature and agreeable temperament.

== Description ==
The lilacine amazon is a small parrot, approximately 34 cm long when mature, with primarily green plumage. Like the red-lored amazon, it has red lores and yellow cheeks; its distinguishing features include a fully black beak, and lilac-tipped feathers on its crown.

== Behavior ==
The lilacine amazon is known for its gentle and timid nature. In the wild it avoids confrontation with intruders, opting to seek cover in nearby foliage until danger has passed. It usually spends time in small- to medium-sized groups, with which it roosts at night; many birds pair off monogamously within the larger group, and they are most frequently seen flying in pairs.

=== Diet ===
The diet of the lilacine amazon consists primarily of fruits, nuts, berries, and seeds. Like most parrots, it possesses a powerful beak; its dexterous tongue also helps to break down and consume a diverse suite of foodstuffs.

=== Breeding ===
Sexual maturity is reached at three or four years of age. Like most parrots, the lilacine amazon is a monogamous breeder and a cavity nester. The hen will lay two to four eggs in a tree cavity and incubate them for a period of three weeks; the young fledge about two months after hatching.

As with many other parrots, the male will keep the female and chicks nourished during their time in the nest by consuming additional food and regurgitating it for them.

== Distribution and habitat ==
The lilacine amazon is native to the tropical dry forests of western Ecuador north of the Gulf of Guayaquil, extending to Nariño in extreme south-western Colombia adjacent to the Ecuadorian border, where it intersects with the subspecies A. a. salvini.

== Aviculture ==
Lilacine amazons have become well regarded as companion parrots, intelligent with a personality often described as gentle, affectionate, and loyal. In captivity, they enjoy the company of people, and will often form a strong bond with their owner. They are not known as exceptional talkers, but most individuals are able to learn to mimic at least a few phrases. The World Parrot Trust recommends that the lilacine amazon be housed in an enclosure with a minimum length of 3 metres.

The lilacine amazon has only recently become popular and common in the pet trade, formerly being quite rare. At least one captive breeding program has been established in Europe to increase the bird's numbers.
