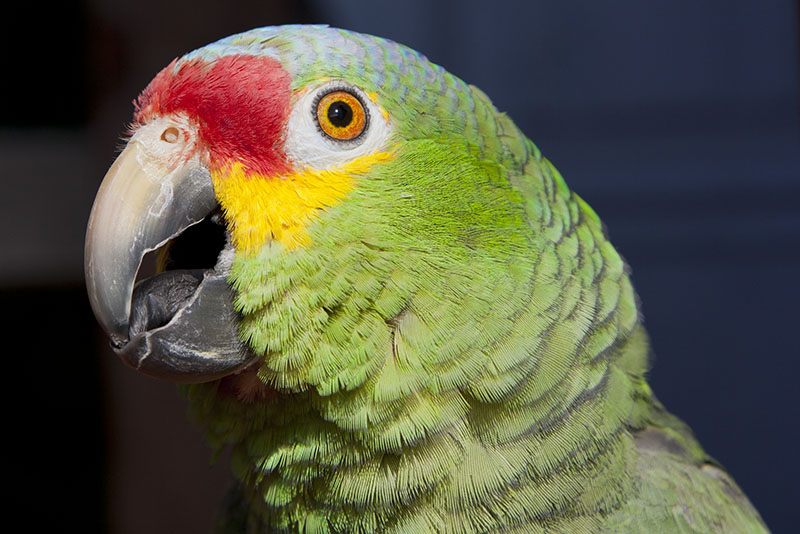
- Amazona autumnalis

Scientific classification
- Kingdom: Animalia
- Phylum: Chordata
- Class: Aves
- Order: Psittaciformes
- Family: Psittacidae
- Subfamily: Arinae
- Tribe: Androglossini; Sundevall, 1872

Genera
- Pionopsitta; Triclaria; Pyrilia; Pionus; Graydidascalus; Alipiopsitta; Amazona

= Androglossini =

Tribe of birds

Androglossini is a tribe of birds belonging to the family Psittacidae, whose members inhabit the Neotropical region. It is one of the two tribes of the subfamily Arinae, with the other being Arini.

== Systematics ==
Image	Genus	Living species
	Pyrilia Bonaparte, 1856	Vulturine parrot, Pyrilia vulturina; Bald parrot, Pyrilia aurantiocephala; Brown-hooded parrot, Pyrilia haematotis; Rose-faced parrot, Pyrilia pulchra; Orange-cheeked parrot, Pyrilia barrabandi; Saffron-headed parrot, Pyrilia pyrilia; Caica parrot, Pyrilia caica
	Pionopsitta Bonaparte, 1854	Pileated parrot, Pionopsitta pileata
	Graydidascalus Bonaparte, 1854	Short-tailed parrot, Graydidascalus brachyurus
	Alipiopsitta Caparroz and Pacheco, 2006	Yellow-faced parrot, Alipiopsitta xanthops
	Pionus Wagler, 1832	Blue-headed parrot, Pionus menstruus; Red-billed parrot, Pionus sordidus; Scaly-headed parrot, Pionus maximiliani; White-crowned parrot, Pionus senilis; Plum-crowned parrot, Pionus tumultuosus; White-capped parrot, Pionus seniloides; Bronze-winged parrot, Pionus chalcopterus; Dusky parrot, Pionus fuscus
	Amazona Lesson, 1830	Cuban amazon, Amazona leucocephala; Yellow-billed amazon, Amazona collaria; Hispaniolan amazon, Amazona ventralis; White-fronted amazon, Amazona albifrons; Yucatán amazon, Amazona xantholora; Black-billed amazon, Amazona agilis; Puerto Rican amazon, Amazona vittata; Tucumán amazon, Amazona tucumana; Red-spectacled amazon, Amazona pretrei; Red-crowned amazon, Amazona viridigenalis; Lilac-crowned amazon, Amazona finschi; Red-lored amazon, Amazona autumnalis; Diademed amazon, Amazona diadema; Blue-cheeked amazon, Amazona dufresniana; Red-browed amazon, Amazona rhodocorytha; Red-tailed amazon, Amazona brasiliensis; Festive amazon, Amazona festiva; Yellow-shouldered amazon, Amazona barbadensis; Turquoise-fronted amazon, Amazona aestiva; Yellow-headed amazon, Amazona oratrix; Tres Marías amazon, Amazona tresmariae; Yellow-naped amazon, Amazona auropalliata; Yellow-crowned amazon, Amazona ochrocephala; Orange-winged amazon, Amazona amazonica; Scaly-naped amazon, Amazona mercenarius; Kawall's amazon, Amazona kawalli; Southern mealy amazon, Amazona farinosa; Northern mealy amazon, Amazona guatemalae; Vinaceous-breasted amazon, Amazona vinacea; Saint Lucia amazon, Amazona versicolor; Red-necked amazon, Amazona arausiaca; Saint Vincent amazon, Amazona guildingii; Imperial amazon, Amazona imperialis; Martinique amazon, Amazona martinica (extinct); Guadeloupe amazon, Amazona violacea (extinct)
	Triclaria Wagler, 1832	Blue-bellied parrot, Triclaria malachitacea
