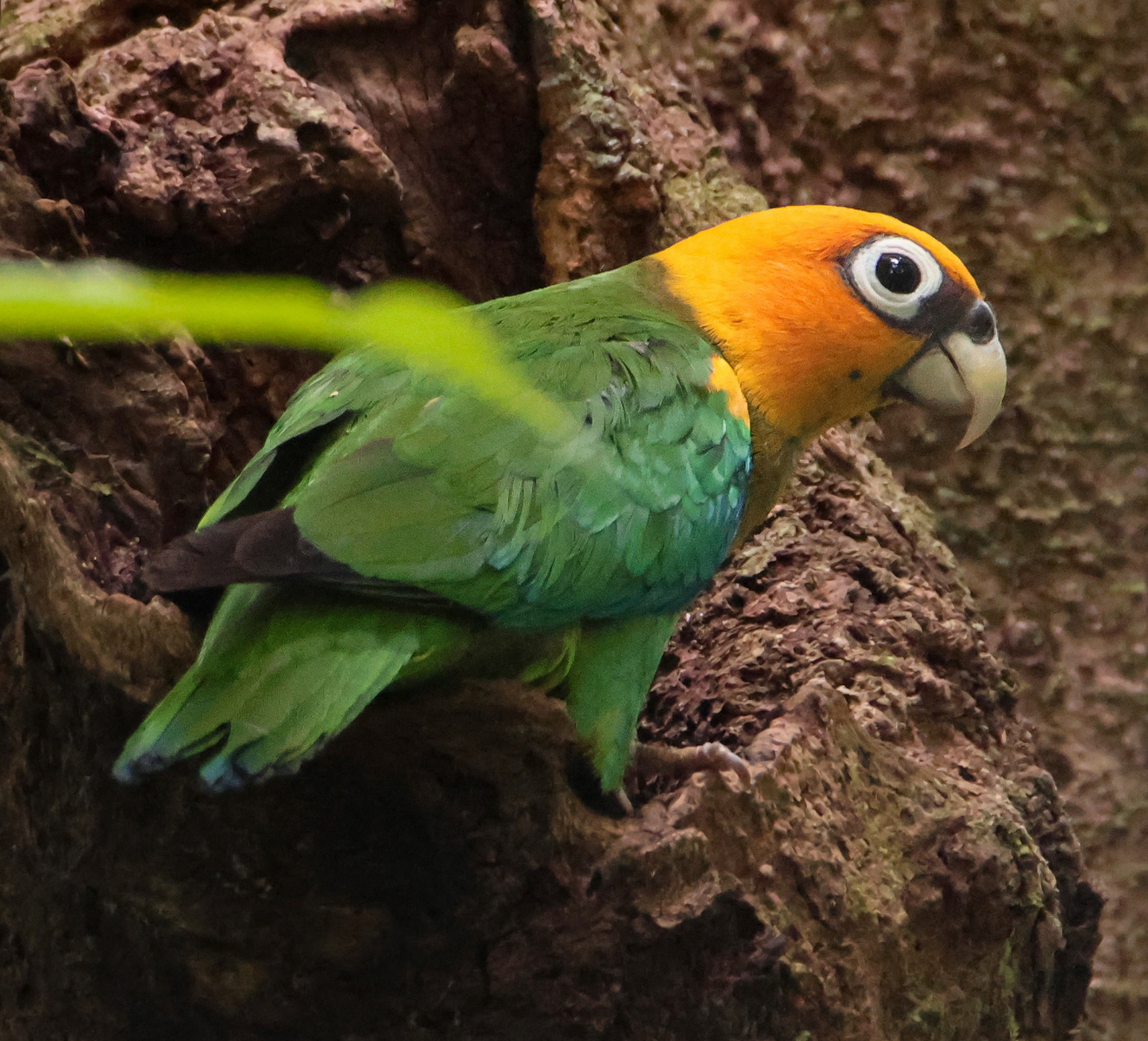

Conservation status
- Near Threatened (IUCN 3.1)
- CITES Appendix II (CITES)

Scientific classification
- Kingdom: Animalia
- Phylum: Chordata
- Class: Aves
- Order: Psittaciformes
- Family: Psittacidae
- Genus: Pyrilia
- Species: P. pyrilia

Binomial name
- Pyrilia pyrilia (Bonaparte, 1853)

Synonyms
- Pionopsitta pyrilia; Gypopsitta pyrilia

= Saffron-headed parrot =

Species of bird

The saffron-headed parrot (Pyrilia pyrilia) is a Near Threatened species of bird in subfamily Arinae of the family Psittacidae, the African and New World parrots. It is found in Colombia, Panama, and Venezuela.

== Taxonomy and systematics ==
The saffron-headed parrot and the other six members of genus Pyrilia were until the early 21st century included in genus Pionopsitta with the pileated parrot (P. pileata). The saffron-headed parrot is monotypic.

== Description ==
The saffron-headed parrot is 22 to 24 cm (8.7 to 9.4 in) long. Adults have an almost entirely yellow head and neck. They have a ring of bare white skin around their eye; brown feathers are around it and on their lores and nares, and a red wash is behind the eye. Their breast is olive that continues as a thin line around the back of the neck. Most of the rest of their body is green, with yellow shoulders, red carpals and flanks, and yellow lower thighs. Their primaries are blackish and their tail feathers have dusky blue tips. Immature birds have green heads, shoulders, and carpals.

== Distribution and habitat ==
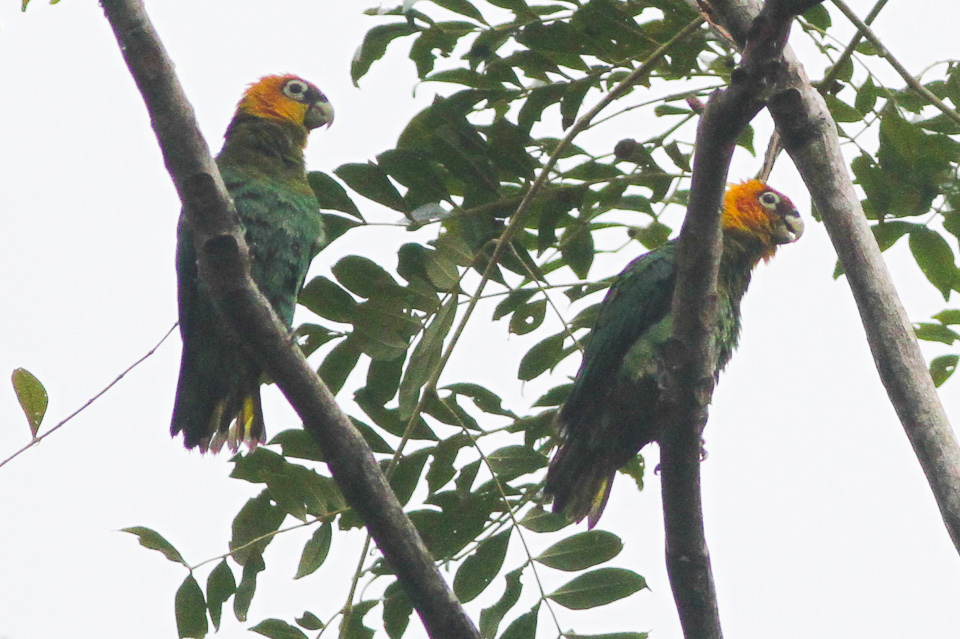
In the wild

The saffron-headed parrot is found in Panama's eastern Darién Province, in north and central Colombia, and in northwestern Venezuela. Though one source describes it as "very rare (status uncertain)" in Ecuador, the South American Classification Committee of the American Ornithological Society does not recognize any records in that country. It inhabits the interior and edges of humid to wet forest, both primary and secondary, usually at elevations below about 900 m (3,000 ft). It occurs in cloudforest up to 1,650 m (5,400 ft) but that may be only seasonally.

== Behavior ==
=== Movement ===
The saffron-headed parrot appears to be mostly sedentary, with possibly seasonal elevational movements and some nomadic roaming.

=== Feeding ===
Nothing is known about the saffron-headed parrot's feeding behavior or diet.

=== Breeding ===
The saffron-headed parrot breeds between March and June in Colombia. Nothing else is known about its breeding biology.

=== Vocalization ===
The saffron-headed parrot's most common calls are "a shrieking "cureek" or "queek" " that are made both from a perch and in flight. It also "utters piercing, hoarse-sounding calls" from perches.

== Status ==
The IUCN originally assessed the saffron-headed parrot as Vulnerable but in 2007 relisted it as Near Threatened. It has a somewhat restricted range and its estimated population of under 20,000 mature individuals is believed to be decreasing. Its status in much of Colombia is unclear but it is common in some areas such as the Serranía de las Quinchas. "The most severe threat to the species is the loss and degradation of its forest habitat." It is also taken by the pet trade and is hunted for food in Venezuela's Serranía del Perijá. Though the species is found in some protected areas, much of its remaining habit is outside them. "Throughout its range, the altitudes that this parrot favours coincide with those that are most attractive for agriculture and human settlement."
