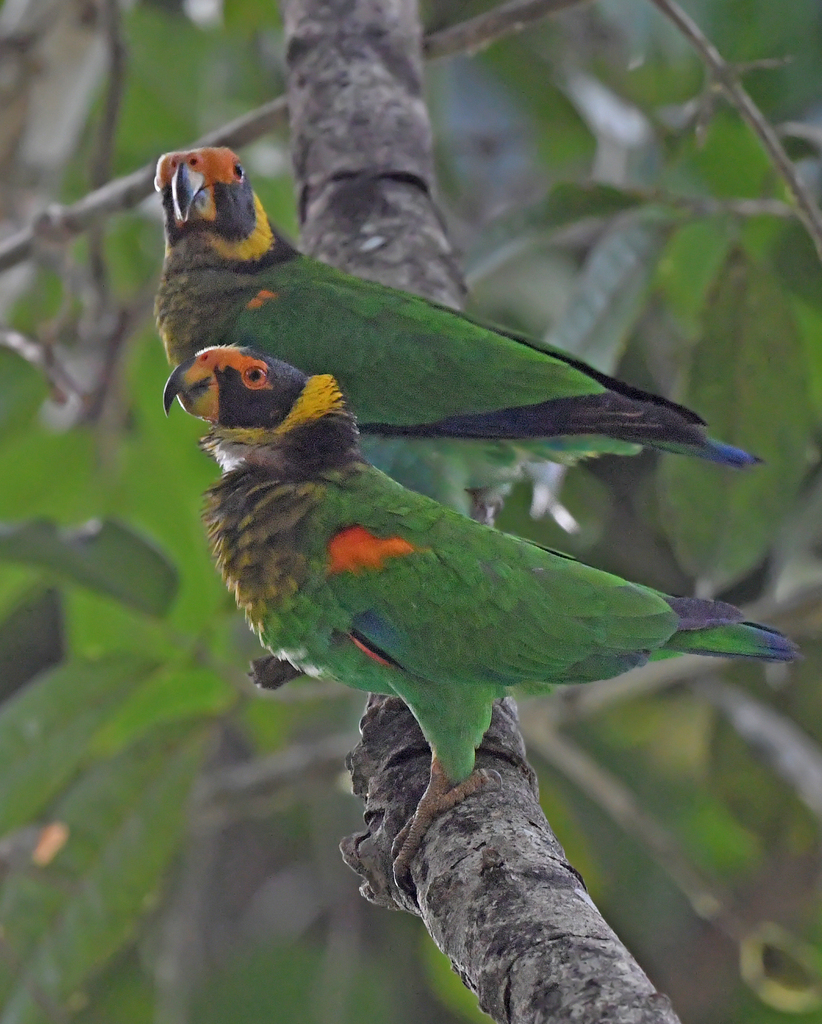

Conservation status
- Least Concern (IUCN 3.1)
- CITES Appendix II (CITES)

Scientific classification
- Kingdom: Animalia
- Phylum: Chordata
- Class: Aves
- Order: Psittaciformes
- Family: Psittacidae
- Genus: Pyrilia
- Species: P. vulturina

Binomial name
- Pyrilia vulturina (Kuhl, 1820)

Synonyms
- Pionopsitta vulturina (Kuhl, 1820); Gypopsitta vulturina

= Vulturine parrot =

Species of bird

The vulturine parrot (Pyrilia vulturina) is a species of bird in subfamily Arinae of the family Psittacidae, the African and New World parrots. It is endemic to Brazil.

== Taxonomy and systematics ==
Until about 1970 the vulturine parrot had been treated as the only member of genus Gypopsitta before being moved into Pionositta with the pileated parrot (P. pileata) and six other parrots species. All but the pileated parrot were moved into genus Pyrilia in the early 21st century.

In 2002, what had been thought to be the immature plumage of the vulturine parrot was determined to be a separate species, the bald parrot (Pyrilia aurantiocephala).

The vulturine parrot is monotypic.

== Description ==
The vulturine parrot is 23 to 25 cm (9.1 to 9.8 in) long and weighs 138 to 165 g (4.9 to 5.8 oz). The adult's face is mostly bare black skin, with yellowish lores and a collar of yellow feathers and a band of black feathers below that. Their upperparts are green with a reddish orange shoulder. Their breast is olive-yellow, their belly green with some blue edges to the feathers, and their lower thighs yellow. Their primaries are black with green edges and their carpal's edges and underwing coverts are red. Their tail's upper surface is green with blue tips and the lower surface green and yellow. Immature birds have green feathered heads with yellowish around the lores and eye and without the adult's yellow collar.

== Distribution and habitat ==
The vulturine parrot is found in Brazil south of the Amazon River from the Madeira River east to near the Atlantic coast in Maranhão. It inhabits both fairly dry terra firme and seasonally flooded várzea forests.

== Behavior ==
=== Movement ===
The vulturine parrot's movements, if any, are not known.

=== Feeding ===
Little is known about the vulturine parrot's foraging behavior or diet, but it is suspected that the bare head is an adaptation to avoid feather-matting from large sticky fruits.

=== Breeding ===
Nothing is known about the vulturine parrot's breeding biology.

=== Vocalization ===
The vulturine parrot's flight call is "a slightly nasal rhythmic "tree ... trayaweet" or simply "trayaweet"." It makes "a wide variety of calls, ranging from nasal yelps or barks to more melodious whistles and whining sounds, as well as more typically parrot-like calls" when perched.

== Status ==
The IUCN originally assessed the vulturine parrot as Near Threatened, then in 2004 as being of Least Concern, in 2012 as Vulnerable, and since 2021 again as of Least Concern. It has a large range, but its population size is not known and is believed to be decreasing. "The primary threat to this species is accelerating deforestation in the Amazon basin as land is cleared for cattle ranching and soy production, facilitated by expansion of the road network." It is considered uncommon throughout its range. The only protected area within that range is in the western part of it.
