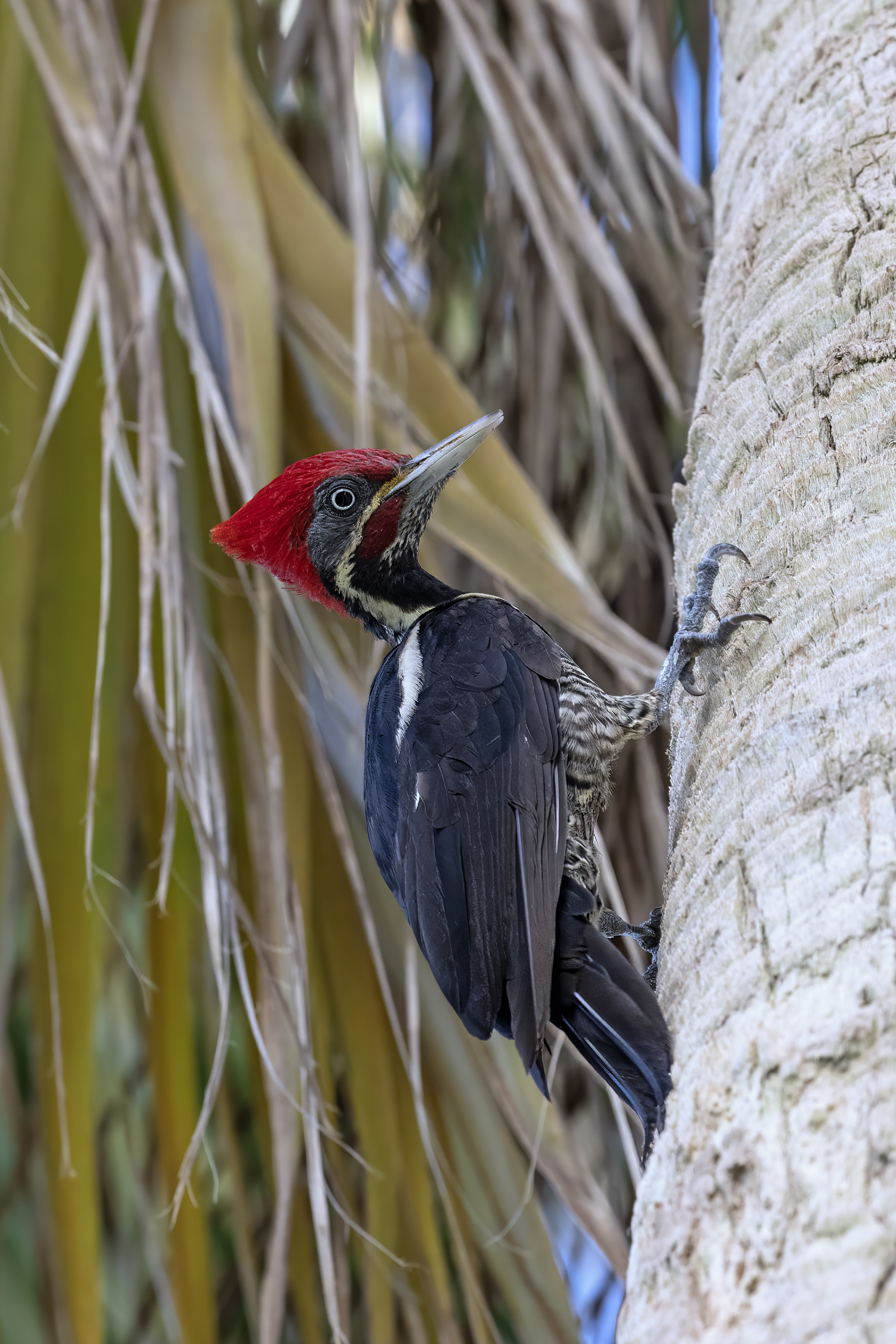

Conservation status
- Least Concern (IUCN 3.1)

- Least Concern (IUCN 3.1)(See Taxonomy and Status sections)

Scientific classification
- Kingdom: Animalia
- Phylum: Chordata
- Class: Aves
- Order: Piciformes
- Family: Picidae
- Genus: Dryocopus
- Species: D. lineatus

Binomial name
- Dryocopus lineatus (Linnaeus, 1766)

Subspecies
- 5 subspecies, see text

Synonyms
- Picus lineatus Linnaeus, 1766; Hylatomus lineatus (Linnaeus, 1766)

= Lineated woodpecker =

Species of bird

The lineated woodpecker (Dryocopus lineatus) is a very large woodpecker which is a resident breeding bird from southern Mexico to northern Argentina and Trinidad in the Caribbean.

== Taxonomy ==
In 1760 the French zoologist Mathurin Jacques Brisson included a description of the lineated woodpecker in his Ornithologie based on a specimen collected in Cayenne, French Guiana. He used the French name Le pic noir hupé de Cayenne and the Latin name Picus niger cayanensis cristatus. Although Brisson coined Latin names, these do not conform to the binomial system and are not recognised by the International Commission on Zoological Nomenclature. When in 1766 the Swedish naturalist Carl Linnaeus updated his Systema Naturae for the 12th edition, he added 240 species that had been previously described by Brisson. One of these was the lineated woodpecker. Linnaeus included a terse description, coined the binomial name Picus lineatus, and cited Brisson's work. The specific name lineatus is Latin and means "lined" or "marked with lines". The lineated woodpecker is now one of six species that the International Ornithological Committee (IOC) and the Clements taxonomy place in the genus Dryocopus. The North American Classification Committee of the American Ornithological Society concurs for the lineated and pileated woodpeckers, the only two of the six that occur in Central and North America. However, BirdLife International's Handbook of the Birds of the World (HBW) places the pileated and several others in the genus Hylatomus. Genus Dryocopus was introduced by the German naturalist Friedrich Boie in 1826.

The IOC and Clements recognize these five subspecies:

- D. l. scapularis – (Vigors, 1829): found in western Mexico (Sonora south to Guerrero). The white stripe on the sides of the face is reduced or lacking; also smaller than similis and nominate lineatus. Bill pale, pale horn, dull white, or bluish-white.
- D. l. similis – (Lesson, 1847): found in eastern and southern Mexico south to northwestern Costa Rica. Bill pale, pale horn, dull white, or bluish-white. Underparts buffy. Body mass is 136–181 g (4.8–6.4 oz).
- D. l. lineatus – (Linnaeus, 1766): nominate, found in eastern and southern Costa Rica south to western Colombia and east to Trinidad, the Guianas and northeastern and eastern Brazil (Maranhão, Bahia), and south to eastern Peru, northern Paraguay and south central Brazil (São Paulo). Bill dark. Body mass is 186–228 g (6.6–8.0 oz).
- D. l. fuscipennis – (P. L. Sclater, 1860): found in western Ecuador and northwestern Peru. Bill dark. Smaller than nominate lineatus. Plumage browner, less black.
- D. l. erythrops – (Valenciennes, 1826): found in eastern Paraguay, northern and northeastern Argentina, and southeastern Brazil. Bill dark. Larger than nominate. White scapular lines are often reduced; generally, the scapular lines are absent in southern populations, but the "proportion of individuals with scapular lines increases towards range of nominate lineatus" (Winkler et al., 1995). Body mass is 216–264 g (7.6–9.3 oz).

However, HBW separates D. l. fuscipennis as the "dusky-winged woodpecker".

== Description ==
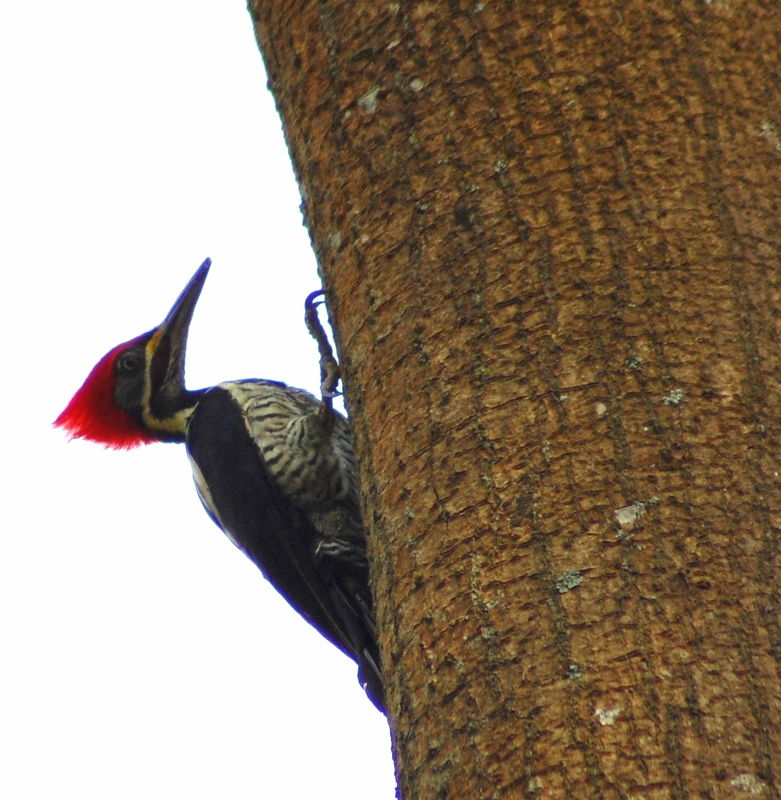
Note narrow face stripe

The lineated woodpecker is 31.5 to 36 cm (12.4 to 14.2 in) long. It resembles the closely related pileated woodpecker (Dryocopus pileatus) of the United States and Canada.

Adults are mainly black above, with a red crest and whitish lines from the base of the bill, down the neck and shoulders (though individuals from the south-eastern part of its range commonly lack the line on the shoulders). The underparts are whitish, heavily barred with black. They show white on the wings in flight. Adult males have a red line from the bill to the throat (malar) and a red forehead. In adult females, these plumage features are black. The bill is typically black in both sexes, though pale-billed individuals regularly are seen.

The call of this widespread but wary bird is a loud, ringing wic-wic-wic. Both sexes drum.

In most of its range, it is most likely confused with the crimson-crested woodpecker (Campephilus melanoleucos), which is similar in plumage and size. In the female of that species, the light face line is far broader, and the white shoulder lines meet on the back lower back (forming a "V"). The male crimson-crested woodpecker is quite different with its almost entirely red head.

== Ecology ==
The habitat of this species is forest borders and other open woodland. It is not generally a mountain bird, though it has occasionally been recorded in the uplands (e.g., in the Serranía de las Quinchas of Colombia) Three white eggs are laid in a nest hole on a dead tree and incubated by both sexes. The young are fed by regurgitation.

Lineated woodpeckers chip out holes, often quite large, while searching out insects in trees. They mainly eat insects, especially ants and their larvae, beetles and their larvae, termites, orthopterans, caterpillars with some seeds, such as from Heliconia and Clusia rosea, and fruits, berries, and nuts.

Lineated woodpeckers breed March–April in Panama, April–May in Belize, and February–April in Trinidad and Suriname. Nest cavities are excavated in dead trees at variable heights, from 2 to 27 m (6.6–88.6 ft) above the ground. Both sexes excavate the nests, which are about 45 cm (18 in) deep, 13 cm × 18 cm (5.1 in × 7.1 in) wide, and have an entrance about 9 cm (3.5 in) in diameter. Clutch size ranges from 2–4 eggs (2–3 in Trinidad). Males and females take 2- to 3-hour shifts incubating during the day, but only males incubate at night. Chicks are fed about once an hour by both parents through regurgitation; the female does most of the feeding while the male guards the nest. Incubation and fledging periods not documented.

== Status ==
The IUCN follows HBW taxonomy and so has assessed the "dusky-winged woodpecker" separately from the lineated woodpecker sensu stricto. Both are assessed as being of Least Concern. Neither has an estimate of its population size. The population of the lineated woodpecker is believed to be increasing; the trend of the "dusky-winged"'s population is unknown. No specific threats to either have been identified.
