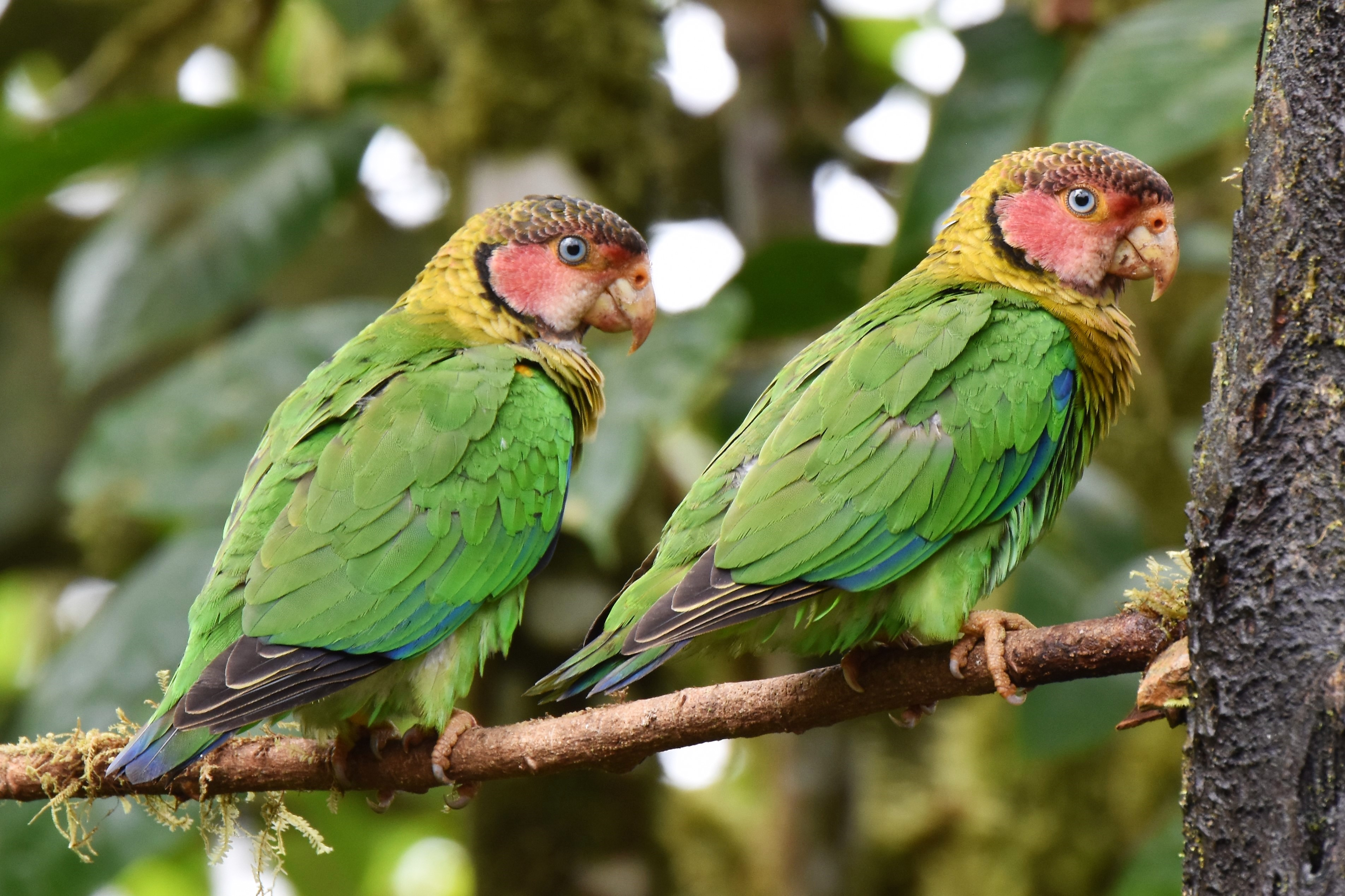

Conservation status
- Least Concern (IUCN 3.1)
- CITES Appendix II (CITES)

Scientific classification
- Kingdom: Animalia
- Phylum: Chordata
- Class: Aves
- Order: Psittaciformes
- Family: Psittacidae
- Genus: Pyrilia
- Species: P. pulchra

Binomial name
- Pyrilia pulchra (Berlepsch, 1897)

Synonyms
- Pionopsitta pulchra Berlepsch, 1897 Gypopsitta pulchra

= Rose-faced parrot =

Species of bird

The rose-faced parrot (Pyrilia pulchra) is a species of bird in subfamily Arinae of the family Psittacidae, the African and New World parrots. It is found in Colombia and Ecuador.

== Taxonomy and systematics ==
The rose-faced parrot and the other six members of genus Pyrilia were until the early 21st century included in genus Pionopsitta with the pileated parrot (P. pileata). The rose-faced parrot has at times been treated as a subspecies of the brown-hooded parrot (Pyrilia haematotis) and they are now considered sister species. The rose-faced parrot is monotypic.

== Description ==
The rose-faced parrot is 21.5 to 23 cm (8.5 to 9.1 in) long. Adults have a reddish brown crown and are pinkish rose from their lores across most of their face. Their nape and breast are dull olive-yellow. Most of the rest of their body is green, with orange and yellow on the bend of the wing, mostly black flight feathers, and blue on the tips of the tail feathers. Their bill is pale creamy whitish. Immature birds are much like adults but with limited rose on the face.

== Distribution and habitat ==
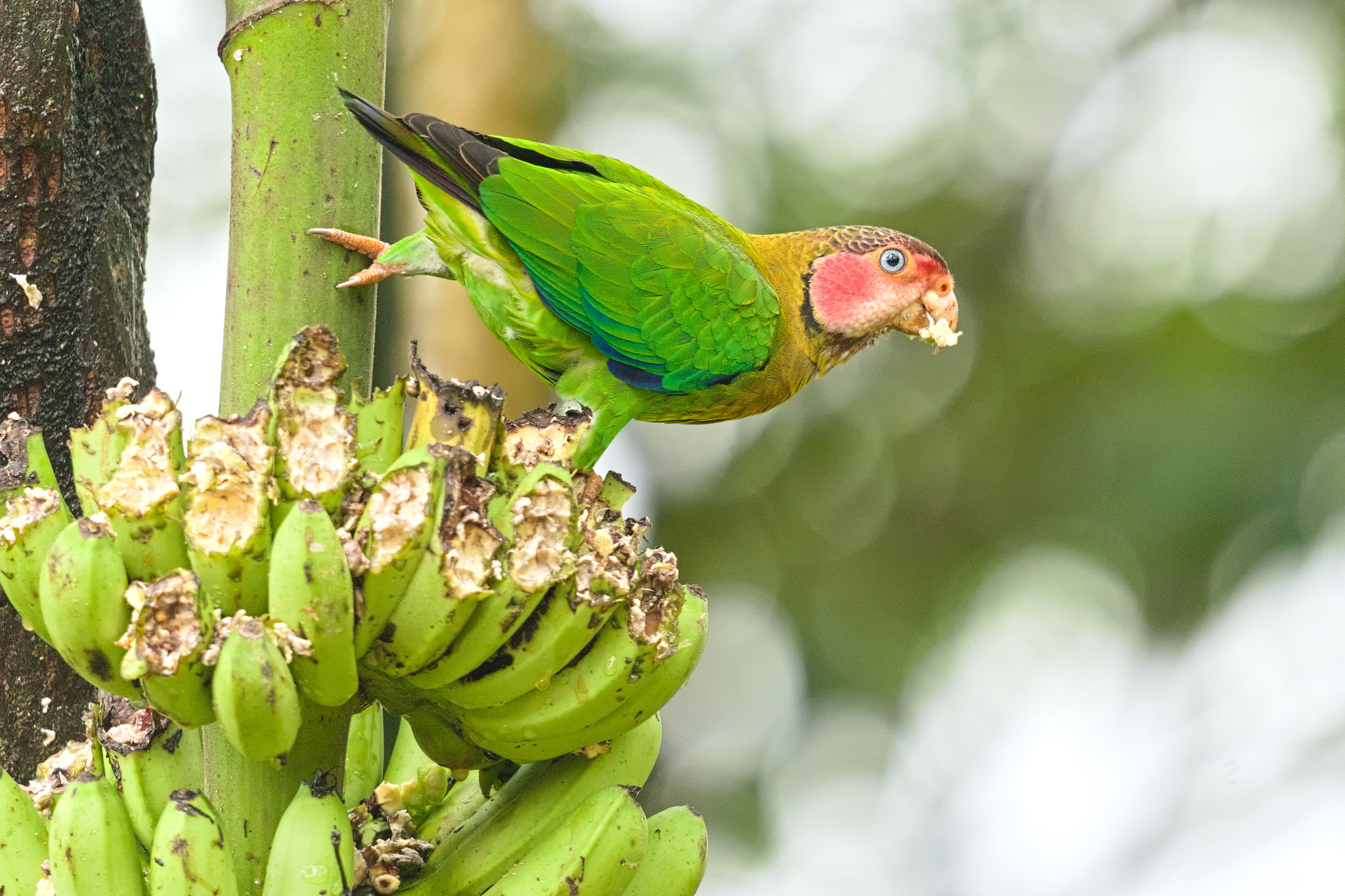
Eating banana

The rose-faced parrot is found from the central part of Colombia's Chocó Department south through western Ecuador into El Oro Province. It inhabits humid to wet forest, mature secondary forest, plantations, and more open areas with scattered trees. Specimens living in forest tend to stay in the canopy. In elevation it mostly occurs below 1,200 m (3,900 ft) but locally is found as high as 2,100 m (6,900 ft).

== Behavior ==
=== Movement ===
The rose-faced parrot might make some seasonal movements but details are lacking.

=== Feeding ===
Almost nothing is known about the rose-faced parrot's feeding behavior or diet, but it has been recorded eating small fruit and cultivated bananas.

=== Breeding ===
The rose-faced parrot breeds between January and March in the northern part of its range and in November-December in the south. Nothing else is known about its breeding biology.

=== Vocalization ===
The rose-faced parrot's flight call is "a harsh, far-carrying 'shreek! shreek!'." It also makes "mostly harsh calls and various gurgling and squeaking notes" when perched.

== Status ==
The IUCN has assessed the rose-faced parrot as being of Least Concern. It has a somewhat restricted range, and though its population size is not known it is believed to be stable. No immediate threats have been identified. "Uncommon and local, but sometimes fairly numerous and capable of doing damage to banana crops."
