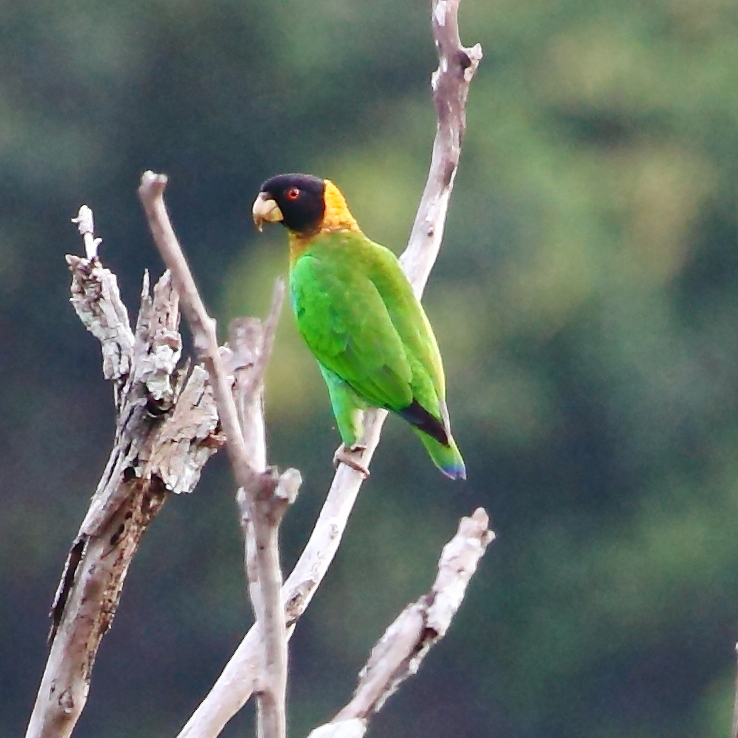
- Caica parrot at Manaus, Amazonas State, Brazil

Conservation status
- Least Concern (IUCN 3.1)
- CITES Appendix II

Scientific classification
- Kingdom: Animalia
- Phylum: Chordata
- Class: Aves
- Order: Psittaciformes
- Family: Psittacidae
- Genus: Pyrilia
- Species: P. caica

Binomial name
- Pyrilia caica (Latham, 1790)

Synonyms
- Pionopsitta caica; Gypopsitta caica

= Caica parrot =

Species of bird

The caica parrot (Pyrilia caica) is a species of bird in subfamily Arinae of the family Psittacidae, the African and New World parrots. It is found in Brazil, French Guiana, Guyana, Suriname, and Venezuela.

== Taxonomy and systematics ==
The caica parrot and the other six members of genus Pyrilia were until the early 21st century included in genus Pionopsitta with the pileated parrot (P. pileata). The caica parrot is monotypic.

== Description ==
The caica parrot is 23 to 25 cm (9.1 to 9.8 in) long and weighs 121 to 143 g (4.3 to 5.0 oz). Adults have a brownish black head with bare gray skin around the eye. They have a fulvous or golden collar on their hindneck; dark feather edges give it a scaly appearance. Their throat and upper breast are olive-brown and the rest of their body is green. Their primary coverts are dull blue, their primaries are blackish, and their tail feathers have dull blue tips. Immature birds have mostly green heads with a duller collar.

== Distribution and habitat ==
The caica parrot is found from eastern Venezuela through the Guianas into Brazil's Amapá state and south in Brazil to the Amazon River. It occurs almost entirely in mature terra firme forest, generally shunning flooded and secondary forests. In elevation it ranges up to 1,100 m (3,600 ft).

== Behavior ==
=== Movement ===
The caica parrot's movements, if any, are not known.

=== Feeding ===
Little is known about the caica parrot's foraging behavior or diet. It has been observed feeding on seeds and fruits.

=== Breeding ===
The caica parrot breeds between November and January in French Guiana; data are lacking for its breeding season elsewhere. The single known nest was in a tree cavity about 10 m (33 ft) above the ground.

=== Vocalization ===
The caica parrot's flight call is described as "a peculiarly nasal, horn-like call, either a single "kyow", a double-noted "kra ... kyow" or triple-noted "kra.kree ... kyow"." It also "utters a wider variety of short nasal yelps and squeaking notes" when perched.

== Status ==
The IUCN originally assessed the caica parrot as being of Least Concern, then in 2012 as Near Threatened, and then in 2021 again as of Least Concern. It has a fairly large range and an estimated population of 250,000 mature individuals, though the latter is believed to be decreasing. "The primary threat to this species is accelerating deforestation in its range, as land is cleared for cattle ranching and soy production, facilitated by expansion of the road network." It is considered common in French Guiana but uncommon to scarce elsewhere; it does occur in "several large, strict protected areas".
