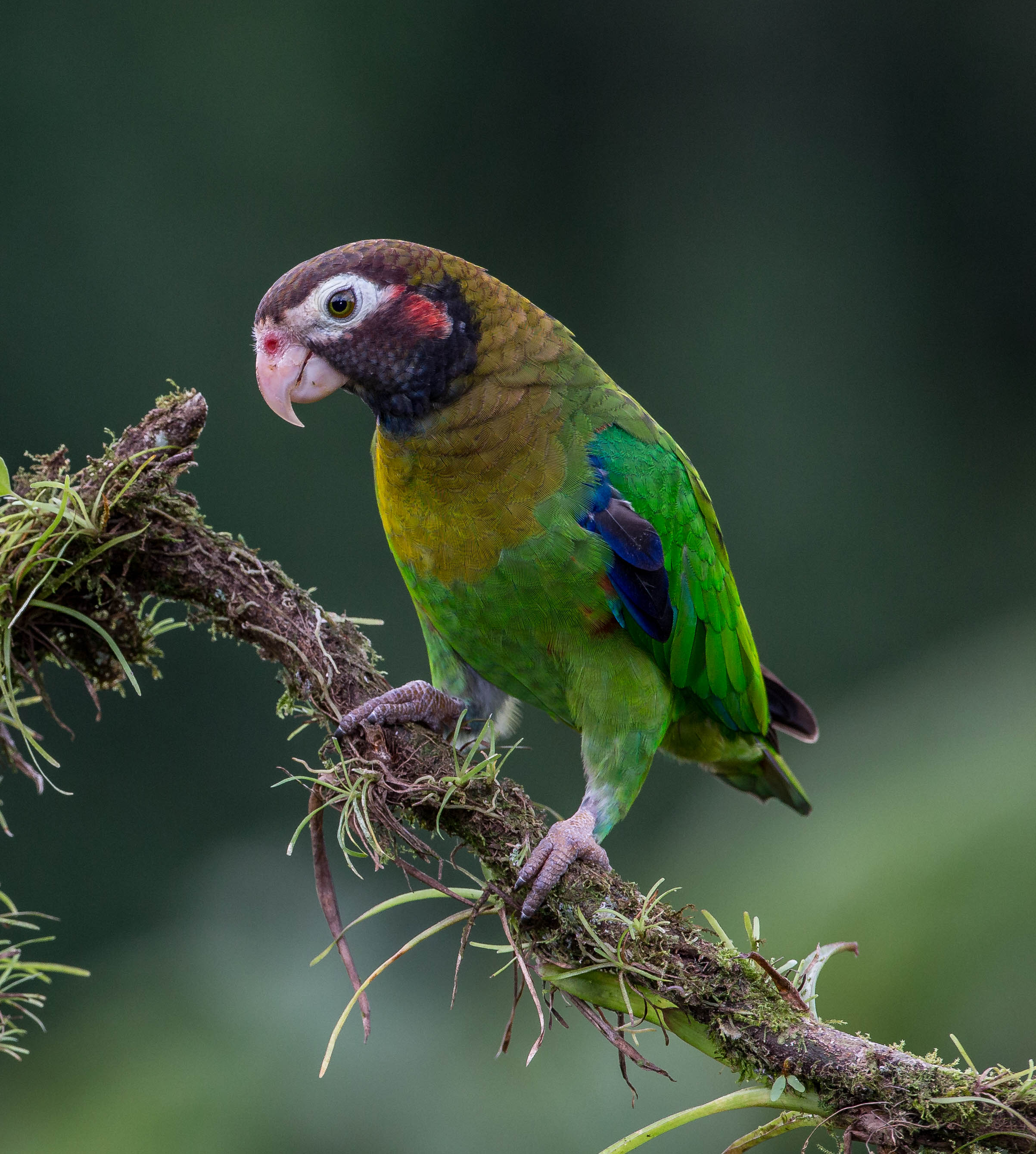

Conservation status
- Least Concern (IUCN 3.1)
- CITES Appendix II (CITES)

Scientific classification
- Kingdom: Animalia
- Phylum: Chordata
- Class: Aves
- Order: Psittaciformes
- Family: Psittacidae
- Genus: Pyrilia
- Species: P. haematotis

Binomial name
- Pyrilia haematotis (Sclater, PL & Salvin, 1860)

Synonyms
- Pionopsitta haematotis Gypopsitta haematotis

= Brown-hooded parrot =

Species of bird

The brown-hooded parrot (Pyrilia haematotis) is a species of bird in subfamily Arinae of the family Psittacidae, the African and New World parrots. It is found from Mexico to Colombia.

== Taxonomy and systematics ==
The brown-hooded parrot and the other six members of genus Pyrilia were until the early 21st century included in genus Pionopsitta with the pileated parrot (P. pileata). The brown-hooded and rose-faced parrot (Pyrilia pulchra) have at times been treated as conspecific and are now considered sister species.

The brown-hooded parrot has two subspecies, the nominate P. h. haematotis (Sclater, PL & Salvin, 1860) and P. h. coccinicollaris (Lawrence, 1862). The latter has at times been suggested as a separate species but this treatment has not been accepted.

== Description ==
The brown-hooded parrot is 21 to 23 cm (8.3 to 9.1 in) long and weighs 145 to 150 g (5.1 to 5.3 oz). Adults have a reddish brown crown, ear coverts, and throat, a pinkish red patch behind the eye, and white nares and eye ring. Their nape and breast are dull olive-yellow and their flanks red. Most of the rest of their body is green, with blue on the wing edge, blackish blue on the flight feathers, and blue on the tips of the tail feathers. Subspecies P. h. coccinicollaris adds some pinkish red below the dark throat that sometimes extends around the neck. Immature birds are much like adults but with a paler head, no red patch behind the eye, and a greener breast.

== Distribution and habitat ==
The nominate subspecies of the brown-hooded parrot is found from Veracruz and Oaxaca in southeastern Mexico south on the Caribbean slope through Belize, Guatemala, Honduras, and Nicaragua and thence on both slopes in Costa Rica and western Panama. P. h. coccinicollaris is found from approximately the Panama Canal into northwestern Colombia's Chocó, Antioquia, and Córdoba departments. The species inhabits the canopy and edges of humid evergreen forest, cloudforest, and mature secondary forest. In elevation it mostly ranges from sea level to 1,200 m (3,900 ft) but occurs as high as 1,900 m (6,200 ft).

== Behavior ==
=== Movement ===
The brown-hooded parrot is thought to make some seasonal elevational movements or, at least in Costa Rica, moving to lower elevation after breeding fairly high.

=== Feeding ===
The brown-hooded parrot forages in the canopy and forest edge. Its diet is mostly fruits and seeds from trees and epiphytes; figs (Ficus) appear to be favored. It has also been observed feeding on mistletoe leaves.

=== Breeding ===
The brown-hooded parrot's breeding season appears to vary geographically but is not well defined. It nests in a cavity in a tree. The clutch size, incubation period, time to fledging, and details of parental care are not known.

=== Vocalization ===
The brown-hooded parrot's flight call has been described as "a clear chirruping kee-reek or curicu-reek" and also as "a high-pitched chreea, cheea". When perched is makes other, rather melodious calls "ranging from yelps to various gurgling and squeaking notes".

== Status ==
The IUCN has assessed the brown-hooded parrot as being of Least Concern. It has a large range and an estimated population of at least 50,000 mature individuals, though the latter is believed to be decreasing. Logging of its habitat is the only identified threat, and it does not appear to be severe. It "is fairly common over much of [its] range and suffers very little persecution even locally from trapping".
