= Serranía de las Quinchas =

- Location within Colombia

Highest point
- Elevation: 1,700 m (5,600 ft)
- Coordinates: 05°56′00″N 74°11′00″W

Geography
- Country: Colombia
- Region(s): Boyacá, Santander

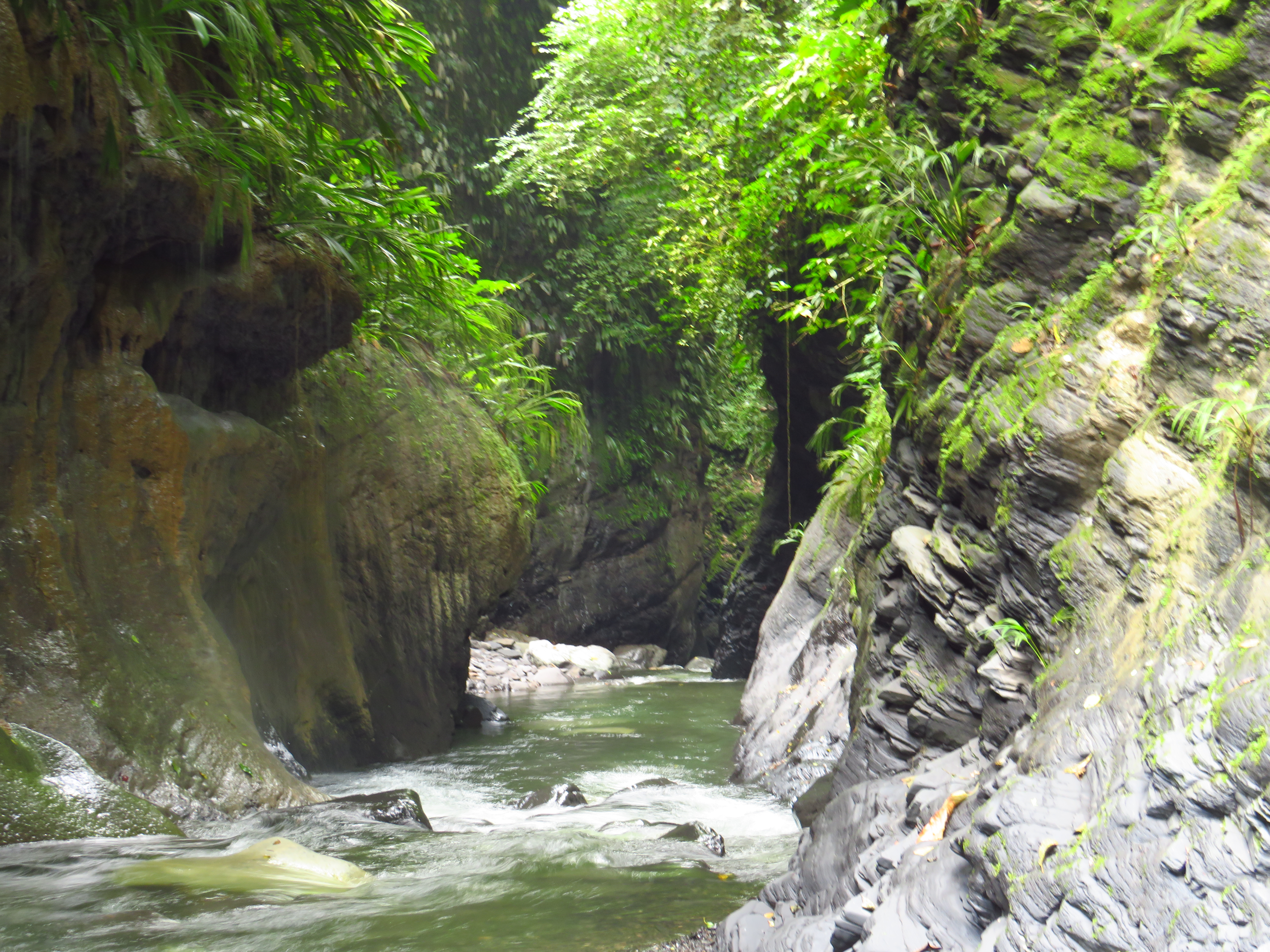
Canyon in Serranía de las Quinchas Regional Natural Park

The Serranía de las Quinchas is an 860 km^{2} area of tropical rainforest and cloud forest in Colombia. It lies in the mid Magdalena River Valley in the foothills of the Cordillera Oriental of the Colombian Andes. It ranges in altitude from 200 m (660 ft) to 1,700 m (5,600 ft). It is listed as an Important Bird Area, under criteria A1 and A2, as it holds populations of globally threatened and restricted range species. It contains the 848 ha (3.27 sq mi) El Paujil Nature Reserve, established by the Fundación ProAves in 2004.

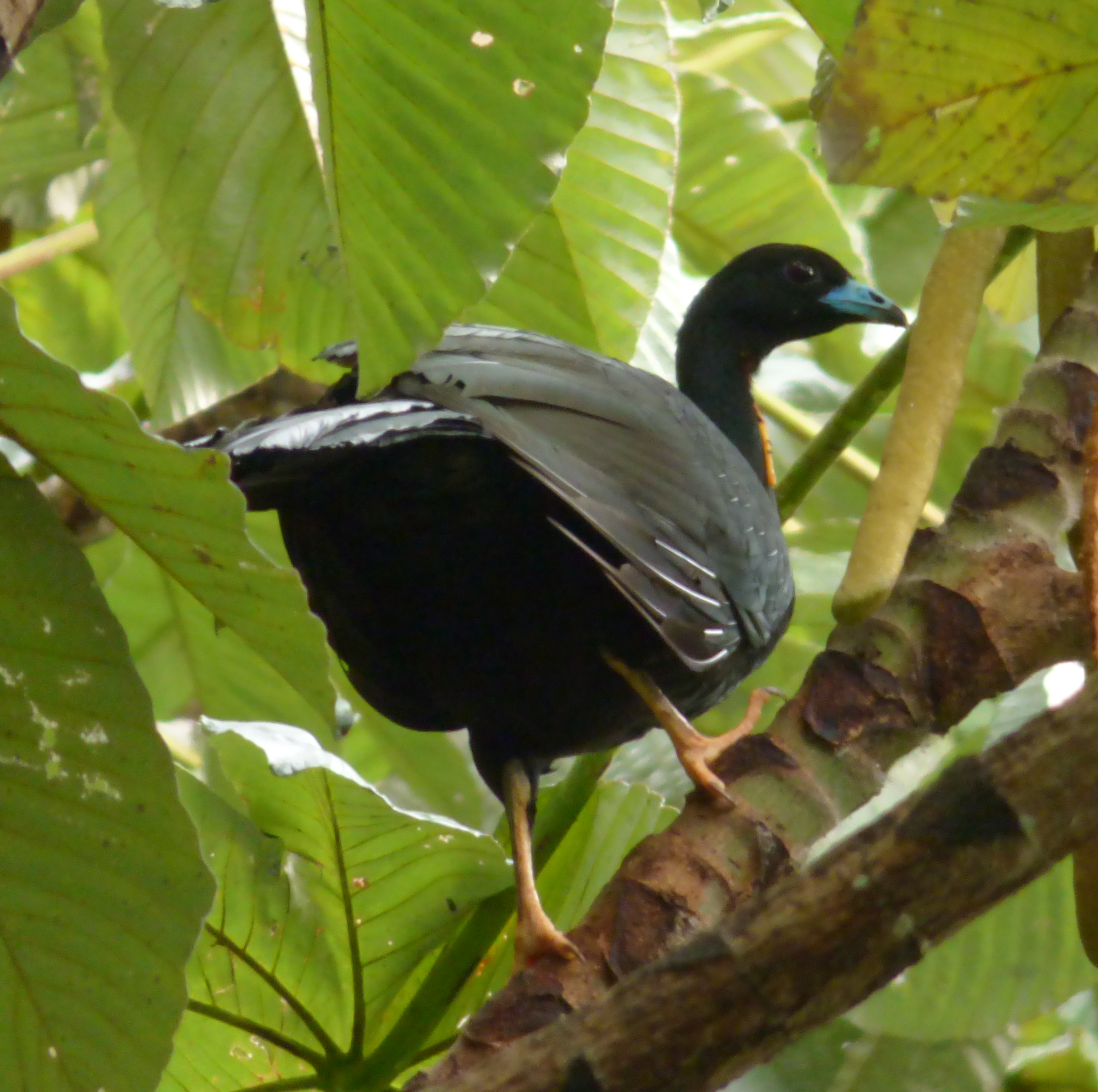
Wattled guan (Aburria aburri), found in the Serranía de las Quinchas

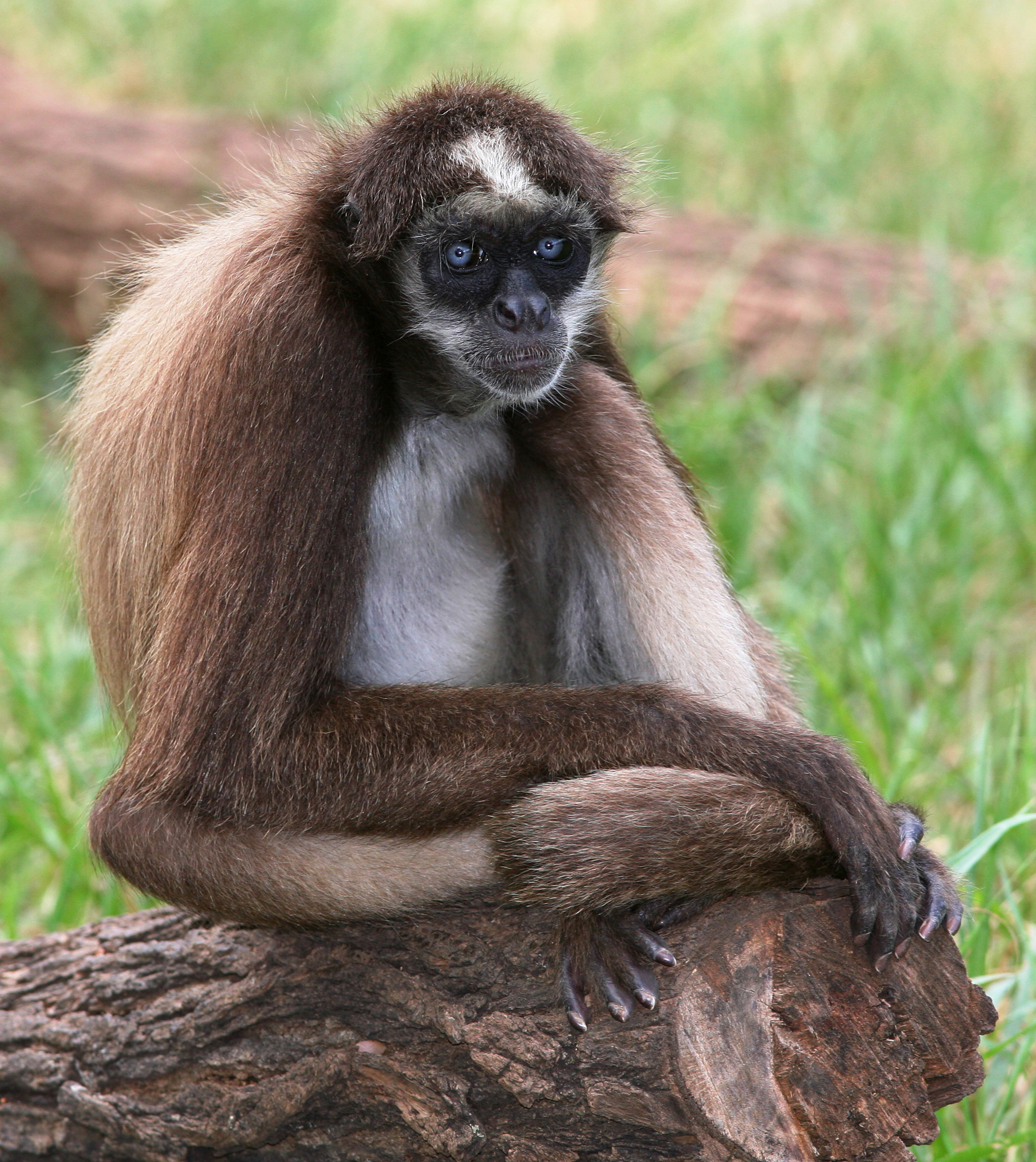
Brown spider monkey (Ateles hybridus), a critically endangered primate found in the region.

Threatened birds found in the Serranía de las Quinchas include the wattled guan, blue-billed curassow, saffron-headed parrot, white-mantled barbet, beautiful woodpecker, Antioquia bristle-tyrant, grey-throated warbler, turquoise dacnis and sooty ant-tanager. It is also home to the critically endangered brown spider monkey.
