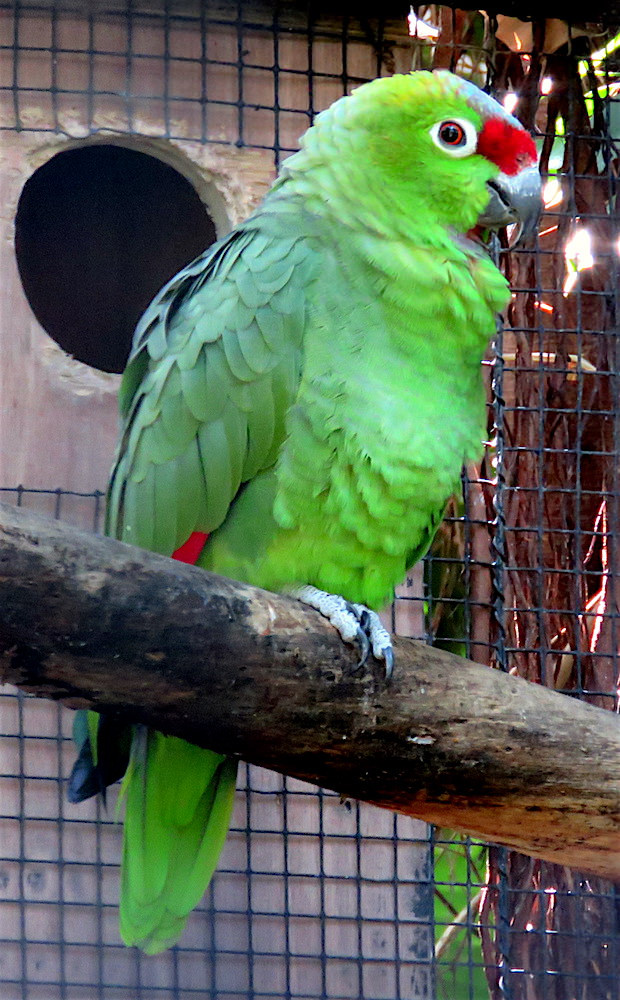

Conservation status
- Least Concern (IUCN 3.1)

Scientific classification
- Kingdom: Animalia
- Phylum: Chordata
- Class: Aves
- Order: Psittaciformes
- Family: Psittacidae
- Genus: Amazona
- Species: A. diadema

Binomial name
- Amazona diadema (Spix, 1824)

= Diademed amazon =

Species of bird

The diademed amazon (Amazona diadema) is a parrot in the family Psittacidae formerly considered conspecific with the red-lored amazon (Amazona autumnalis). Amazona diadema is restricted to the state of Amazonas in north-western Brazil.

== Taxonomy ==
Amazona diadema was formerly considered to be an isolated subspecies of the red-lored amazon (Amazona autumnalis), a widespread species in Mexico, Central America, and northwestern South America; the differences in plumage are slight and molecular analysis may show that its species status is not warranted.

== Description ==
The diademed amazon grows to a length of about 33 cm (13 in). It is a largely green bird with glimpses of red and black; many of the feathers are margined with contrasting colours giving a finely scalloped effect. The crown, nape and neck, breast and belly are green while the forehead, lores and cere are red. This red colour does not extend above the eye in a superciliary streak. The primary wing feathers are dusky black and the secondaries bluish-green; the base of the first five secondaries are red, giving a flash of red colour during flight. The tail is green with the side feathers being tipped yellowish-green, with red at the base. The beak is dark grey and the bare skin surrounding the eye is white. The iris is orange and the legs and feet are pale grey.

== Distribution ==
The diademed amazon is endemic to the Amazon basin in northern Brazil; its range is restricted to the lower part of the Rio Negro and the upper part of the Amazon River in the state of Amazonas. It is found in a variety of lowland forest habitats as well as areas containing scattered trees and plantations. In the Adolfo Ducke Forest Reserve, near Manaus, it is common in the canopy of the humid forest and around the woodland margins. It also occurs in the Jaú National Park where it is uncommon.

== Ecology ==
The species feeds mostly on fruits and nuts. Its behaviour is probably similar to the red-lored amazon, with birds roosting communally outside the breeding season, with daily flights to feeding areas, where the birds forage in the canopy and are well-camouflaged.

== Status ==
This species has a limited range and is threatened by habitat loss caused by the forests where it lives being cleared for cattle farming and soybean production. Some birds are caught by trapping for the domestic pet trade. The International Union for Conservation of Nature has assessed the bird's conservation status as "least concern".
