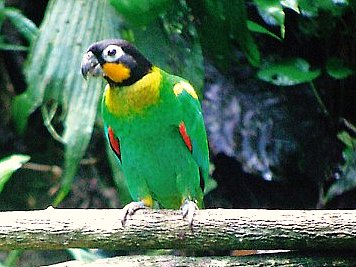

Conservation status
- Least Concern (IUCN 3.1)

Scientific classification
- Kingdom: Animalia
- Phylum: Chordata
- Class: Aves
- Order: Psittaciformes
- Family: Psittacidae
- Genus: Pyrilia
- Species: P. barrabandi

Binomial name
- Pyrilia barrabandi (Kuhl, 1820)

Synonyms
- Pionopsitta barrabandi Gypopsitta barrabandi

= Orange-cheeked parrot =

Species of bird

The orange-cheeked parrot (Pyrilia barrabandi), also known as Barraband's parrot, is a species of parrot in the family Psittacidae. It was formerly placed in the genus Pionopsitta, which is now monotypic.

It is found in the Amazonian Andes, in humid lowland forests in the northwestern, southwestern, and south-central Amazon Basin in South America.

They are threatened with loss of habitat due to the increasing deforestation of the Amazon.

== Taxonomy and systematics ==
The binomial name of this bird commemorates the French painter Jacques Barraband. It was formerly placed in the genus Pionopsitta.

There are two subspecies:

P.b. barrabandi- Found north of the upper Amazon River from east Amazonas, northern Brazil and southern Venezuela to southeast Colombia, eastern Ecuador and northeastern Peru.

P.b. aurantiigena- Found south of the upper Amazon River from northern Brazil to eastern Peru and northern Bolivia.

== Description ==
The parrots are 25 cm (9.8 in) in size and weigh 165–190 g (5.8–6.7 oz).

Adults have an olive throat and breast. The thighs are yellow, with the bend of the wing and lesser wing coverts ranging from yellow to orange, and the carpal edge and underwing coverts being orange to red. The tips of the tail and the wing feathers are blue. P.b. aurantiigena has deep orange cheeks, bend of wing, underwing and lesser wing coverts, and thighs, lacking the yellow possessed by barrabandi. They have a black head and orange to yellow cheeks, with a distinctive white eye-ring around a brown eye. The beak is gray to black.

Juveniles have a brown crown and olive forehead, nape, cheeks and chin, with a brown margin. The bend of the wings and lesser wing coverts are green with a scattered yellow. The carpal edge and underwing coverts are red with scattered green feathers.

=== Vocalizations ===
Distinctive calls that are reedy and slurred in flight. They have guttural alarm calls.

== Ecology and behaviour ==
They are active in the early morning. They are often seen singly, in pairs or in small groups of up to 10 individuals at clay banks.

=== Diet ===
They feed on seeds, fruit, and on wasp larvae in galls. Foraging occurs high in canopy or just below the canopy. They also visit clay banks to consume antacid-like soil which neutralizes the acids found in their food.

=== Breeding ===
Their breeding season is possibly from September–October.

== Distribution and habitat ==
It is found in northwestern Brazil, western Ecuador and Peru, southern Venezuela and Colombia, and extreme northern Bolivia. They are found at elevations of up to 400 m (1,300 ft) in lowland terra firme forest and uncommonly in varzea stands. They also inhabit forest edges and partly disturbed forests.

== Conservation status ==
The species is listed as least concern on the IUCN Red List. It is susceptible to increasing deforestation in the Amazon rainforest, with its population likely to decrease by 25-30% as it loses habitat. The species is naturally rare in its range.

== As pets ==
They are uncommonly kept as pets, and are kept as pets in Brazil.
