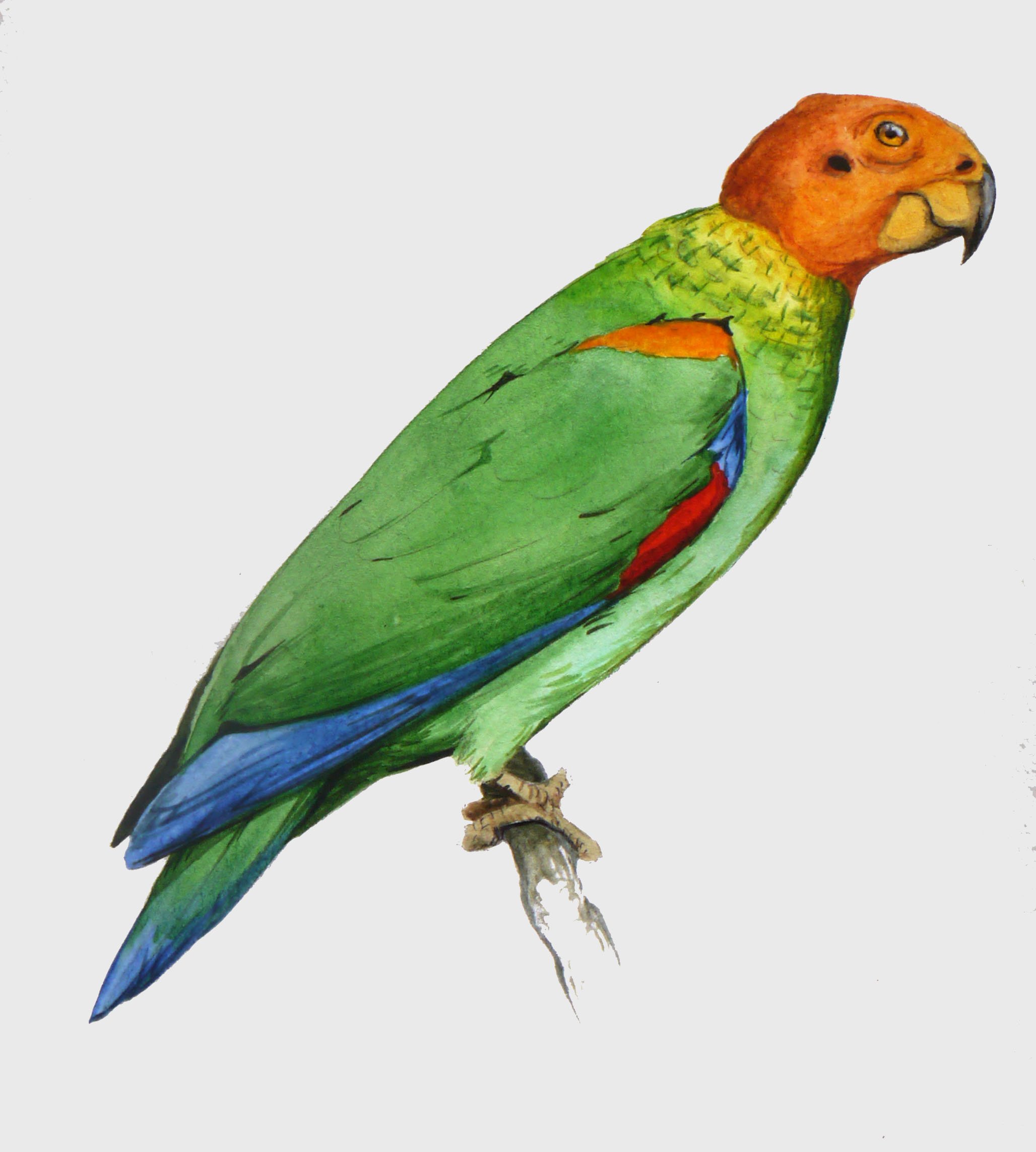
- Bald parrot (Pyrilia aurantiocephala)
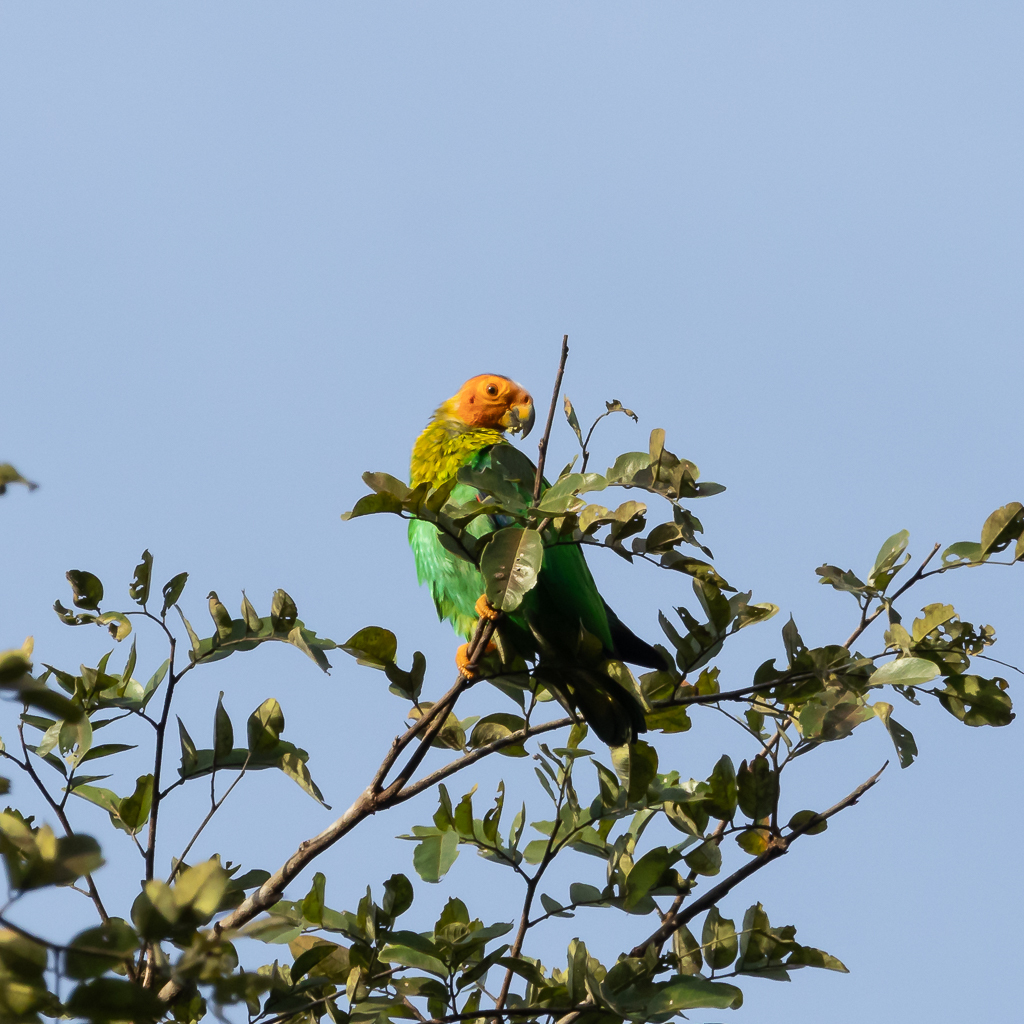

Conservation status
- Near Threatened (IUCN 3.1)

Scientific classification
- Kingdom: Animalia
- Phylum: Chordata
- Class: Aves
- Order: Psittaciformes
- Family: Psittacidae
- Genus: Pyrilia
- Species: P. aurantiocephala

Binomial name
- Pyrilia aurantiocephala (Gaban-Lima, Raposo, M & Höfling, 2002)

Synonyms
- Pionopsitta aurantiocephala Gaban-Lima, Raposo & Höfling, 2002; Gypopsitta aurantiocephala

= Bald parrot =

Species of bird in Brazil

The bald parrot (Pyrilia aurantiocephala) or orange-headed parrot is a species of parrot in the family Psittacidae. It is endemic to the east-central Amazon of Brazil. Its natural habitat is tropical moist lowland forests. It is considered near threatened by BirdLife International (and consequently IUCN) due to the widespread deforestation of the Amazon.

== Taxonomy ==
This parrot was initially believed to be a juvenile of the vulturine parrot due to the orange coloration of its bald head as opposed to the black of the vulturine. However, when it was discovered that the individuals were sexually mature, they were described as a new species. In reality, juveniles of both species have feathered, greenish heads quite unlike those of the adults. It was formerly placed in the genus Pionopsitta, which is now monotypic.

== Discovery ==
In 1999, Brazilian researchers set out to the Amazon rainforest to find specimens of the small green parrot. Subsequently, many of the researchers found sexually mature orange-headed specimens, who did not flock with other birds, and instead created their own flock. Thus, Brazilian researchers declared the new parrot species to be Pyrilia aurantiocephala. In the Eastern Amazon rainforest, the bald parrot was only recently discovered and was previously presumed to be the vulturine parrot. Prior to the discovery of the bald parrot, it was found these birds were sexually mature and had the potential to be a new species.

== Distribution and habitat ==
Bald parrots can be found in the humid tropical lowlands spreading throughout the Lower River Madeira and Upper River Tapajós and River Teles Pires, in central Brazil.

== Conservation ==
The bald parrot flocks among other parrots, with a population size of 6,700; however, it is decreasing, as the bald parrot continues to be a rare sight for those who can catch a glimpse due to the impact of deforestation in its native habitat. Although 6,700 refers to the estimated number of mature parrots present, an estimated 10,000 Bald Parrots equate to the total population of their species.

== Description ==
The bald parrot is a medium-small, overall green parrot with a bald, brownish-orange head. As several other members of the genus Pyrilia, it has red underwing coverts that barely are visible when perched, but highly conspicuous in flight. The bald parrot communicates with sounds that consist of a high pitched "skee-skee-skee" and a rolling slightly nasal of a "chow-chow-chow". Their diet includes flowers, seeds, fruits, and insects. This medium-sized bird is known for its bare skin and orange head. It has the complexion of intensely orange skin, a paler and more yellow color around the eye, black(ish) coloring around the neck, a mostly green lower neck, light yellow tint to the green wings, and tinged with blue on the lower belly. The unique coloring and baldness of this parrot's head give it its name.
