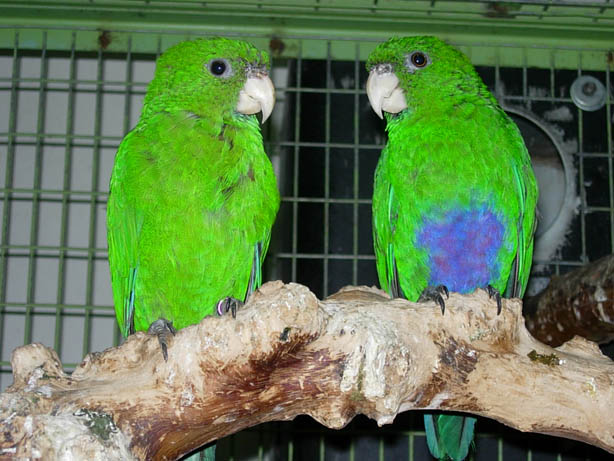
- Male right, female left

Conservation status
- Least Concern (IUCN 3.1)

Scientific classification
- Kingdom: Animalia
- Phylum: Chordata
- Class: Aves
- Order: Psittaciformes
- Family: Psittacidae
- Tribe: Androglossini
- Genus: Triclaria; Wagler, 1832
- Species: T. malachitacea

Binomial name
- Triclaria malachitacea (Spix, 1824)

= Blue-bellied parrot =

Species of bird

The blue-bellied parrot or purple-bellied parrot (Triclaria malachitacea) is the only species in its genus. It is generally considered endemic to the humid Atlantic Forest of southeastern Brazil, but there are two unconfirmed records from Misiones in Argentina. It occurs up to 1000 m. (3300 ft).

It is a relatively long-tailed parrot with a total length of c. 28 cm. (11 in). It is green overall and the beak is whitish. Only the male has the bluish-purple patch on the belly for which this species is named. It has a whistled call and pairs will sing in duet, but it is typically fairly quiet and therefore easily overlooked.

It has been recorded feeding on seeds, fruits, flower buds, nectar and some insects. The nest is placed in the cavity of a large tree or palm. It nests between September (October in Rio Grande do Sul) and January. The pair is highly territorial during the breeding season.

Much of the original forest cover in its range has been removed in favour of cultivated crops like tobacco and bananas. Now mostly restricted to remnant forest strips on slopes and ridges, which cover far less than 10% of the original range. Previously, it was believed that 5,000–10,000 birds survived, but recent evidence suggests that c. 10,000 survive in the state of Rio Grande do Sul alone. Significant populations also exists in the states of Rio de Janeiro and São Paulo, but population estimates for these are not available. Regardless, numbers are dwindling throughout its range due to further habitat changes. The cage-bird trade is not considered a major threat at this point, as only a small number are captured for the local market, but nevertheless fair numbers reached the Netherlands in the 1970–1980s. It occurs in 14 protected areas.
