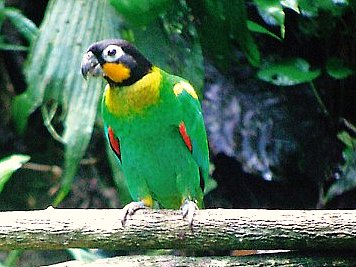
- Orange-cheeked parrot

Scientific classification
- Kingdom: Animalia
- Phylum: Chordata
- Class: Aves
- Order: Psittaciformes
- Family: Psittacidae
- Tribe: Androglossini
- Genus: Pyrilia; Bonaparte, 1856

Type species
- Pyrilia typica Bonaparte, 1856=Psittacula pyrilia Bonaparte, 1853

Diversity
- 7 species

Synonyms
- Gypopsitta

= Pyrilia =

Genus of birds

Pyrilia is a genus of parrots in the family Psittacidae.

All are relatively short-tailed parrots that are restricted to forests in the Neotropics. Their head or face contrasts clearly with the mainly green body, and they have a brownish or olive patch on the chest.

== Taxonomy ==
The genus Pyrilia was introduced in 1856 by the French naturalist Charles Lucien Bonaparte with Pyrilia typica Bonaparte, 1856, as the type species. This scientific name is a junior synonym of Psittacula pyrilia Bonaparte, 1853, the saffron-headed parrot. The name Pyrilia combines the Ancient Greek πυρ/pur, πυρος/puros meaning "fire" with Latin ilia meaning "flanks".

The genus was split from the now-monotypic Pionopsitta, and then briefly moved to Gypopsitta. But as Pyrilia was published a few months before Gypopsitta, the former has priority.

== Species ==
The genus contains seven species:

Image	Scientific name	Common name	Distribution
	Pyrilia haematotis	Brown-hooded parrot	southeastern Mexico to north-western Colombia.
	Pyrilia pulchra	Rose-faced parrot	Colombia and Ecuador.
	Pyrilia pyrilia	Saffron-headed parrot	Colombia, Panama, Venezuela, and possibly Ecuador.
	Pyrilia barrabandi	Orange-cheeked parrot	western Amazon
	Pyrilia caica	Caica parrot	Brazil, French Guiana, Guyana, Suriname, and Venezuela.
	Pyrilia aurantiocephala	Bald parrot or orange-headed parrot,	east-central Amazon of Brazil
	Pyrilia vulturina	Vulturine parrot	eastern Amazon of Brazil
