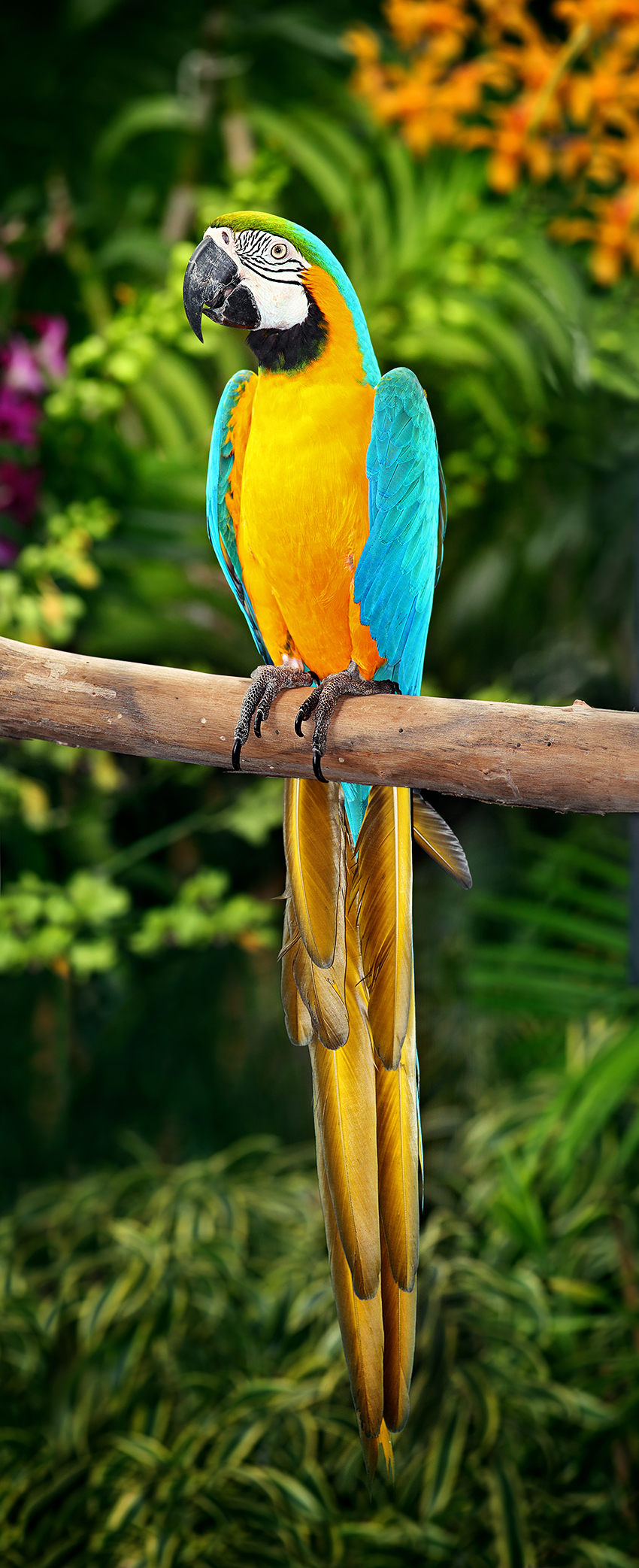
- Blue-and-yellow macaw

Scientific classification
- Kingdom: Animalia
- Phylum: Chordata
- Class: Aves
- Order: Psittaciformes
- Family: Psittacidae
- Subfamily: Arinae; Gray, 1840

Tribes
- Arini; Androglossini; Forpini

= Neotropical parrot =

Neotropical parrots

Subfamily of birds

Arinae, the neotropical parrots or New World parrots is a subfamily comprise about 150 species in 32 genera found throughout South and Central America, Mexico, the Caribbean islands and the southern United States. Among them are some of the most familiar, iconic, and beautiful parrots, including the blue and gold macaw, sun conure, and yellow-headed amazon.

The parrots of the New World have been known to Europeans since Columbus remarked upon them in his journal in 1492. Systematic descriptions of the birds were first available in German naturalist Georg Marcgraf's Historia Naturalis Brasiliae published in 1648, and English naturalist Mark Catesby's two-volume Natural History of Carolina, Florida and the Bahama Islands published in London in 1731 and 1743.

Several species and one genus have become extinct in recent centuries. A second genus is extinct in the wild. Over a third of the extant species are classified as threatened by the IUCN. A few of these are in imminent danger of extinction with fewer than 500 individuals in the wild or in captivity: glaucous macaw, Spix's macaw, blue-throated macaw, Puerto Rican parrot, and indigo-winged parrot. The chief reasons for decline in parrot populations are habitat loss through deforestation by clear-cutting, burning, and flooding by construction of dams, capture for the pet trade, and introduction of non-native predators.

The New World parrots are monophyletic, and have been geographically isolated for at least 30–55 million years by molecular dating methods. Though fairly few fossils of modern parrots are known, most of these are from tribe Arini of macaws and parakeets; the oldest are from 16 million years ago. They attest that modern genera were mostly distinct by the Pleistocene, a few million years ago.

Neotropical parrots comprise at least two monophyletic clades, one of primarily long-tailed species such as the macaws, conures, and allies, and the other of primarily short-tailed parrots such as amazons and allies.

A new species, the bald parrot or orange-headed parrot, was discovered as recently as 2002.

== Taxonomy ==
Neotropical parrots belong to the subfamily Arinae which along with the African or Old World parrots comprise the family Psittacidae, one of three families of true parrots. The taxonomy of the neotropical parrots is not yet fully resolved, but the following subdivision is supported by solid studies.

- Tribe Arini
  - Cyanoliseus – burrowing parrot
  - Enicognathus (two species)
  - Rhynchopsitta – thick-billed parrots (two species)
  - Pyrrhura (around two dozen species, one possibly recently extinct)
  - Anodorhynchus – blue macaws (two living species, one probably recently extinct)
  - Leptosittaca – golden-plumed parakeet
  - Ognorhynchus – yellow-eared parrot
  - Diopsittaca – red-shouldered macaw
  - Guaruba – golden parakeet
  - Conuropsis – Carolina parakeet (extinct)
  - Cyanopsitta – Spix's macaw (extinct in the wild)
  - Orthopsittaca – red-bellied macaw
  - Ara – true macaws (eight living species, and at least one recently extinct)
  - Primolius – some of the mini-macaws (three species, previously called Propyrrhura)
  - Aratinga - sun conure and allies (six living species, at least one recently extinct)
  - Eupsittula – South and Middle American parakeets
  - Psittacara – genus of parakeets in Central and South America, and the Caribbean
  - Thectocercus – Blue-crowned parakeet
- Tribe Androglossini
  - Pionopsitta – pileated parrot
  - Triclaria – blue-bellied parrot
  - Pyrilia (7 species; all previously included in Pionopsitta).
  - Pionus (8 species)
  - Graydidascalus – short-tailed parrot
  - Alipiopsitta – yellow-faced parrot (previously in Amazona, Salvatoria)
  - Amazona – amazon parrots (about 30 living species – one subspecies recently extinct)

Schodde, et al. recognize a division of the remaining genera into several distinct clades, indicating possible previously undefined tribes:

- clade – proposed tribe Forpini
  - Forpus (nine species)
- clade – proposed tribe Amoropsittacini
  - Nannopsittaca (two species)
  - Psilopsiagon (two species, formerly in Bolborhynchus)
  - Bolborhynchus (two species)
  - Touit (eight species)
- clade including Arini
  - Pionites – caiques (four species)
  - Deroptyus – red-fan parrot
- clade including Androglossini
  - Hapalopsittaca (four species)
  - Brotogeris (eight species)
  - Myiopsitta (one or two species)

== See also ==
- Conure
- List of parrots
- List of macaws
- List of amazon parrots
- List of Aratinga parakeets
