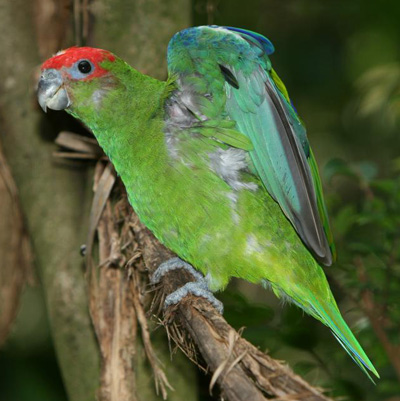
- Adult male

Conservation status
- Least Concern (IUCN 3.1)
- CITES Appendix I

Scientific classification
- Kingdom: Animalia
- Phylum: Chordata
- Class: Aves
- Order: Psittaciformes
- Family: Psittacidae
- Genus: Pionopsitta; Bonaparte, 1854
- Species: P. pileata

Binomial name
- Pionopsitta pileata (Scopoli, 1769)

= Pileated parrot =

Species of bird

The South American pileated parrot (Pionopsitta pileata) is a species of bird in subfamily Arinae of the family Psittacidae, the African and New World parrots. It is found in Argentina, Brazil, and Paraguay. It was formerly known as the red-capped parrot, easily leading to confusion with the Australian Purpureicephalus spurius that bears that English name.

== Taxonomy and systematics ==
The pileated parrot is the only member of genus Pionopsitta and has no subspecies. However, what are now the seven species in genus Pyrilia were for a long period included in Pionopsitta.

A local name for the pileated parrot in Brazilian Portuguese is "cuiú cuiú".

== Description ==
The pileated parrot is 20 to 22 cm (7.9 to 8.7 in) long and weighs 98 to 120 g (3.5 to 4.2 oz). Adults have an essentially all green body, with a yellowish abdomen. Their primaries, primary coverts, and the edges and tips of their tail feathers are dull blue. Males have a red forehead, crown, lores, and upper ear coverts. Females do not have any red but do have a faint blue wash on the forehead and breast. Immature males have less red on the head than adults, and females have less blue on the wings.

== Distribution and habitat ==
The pileated parrot is found in southeastern Brazil from Bahia south and into eastern Paraguay and Argentina's Misiones Province. It mostly inhabits humid forest but also occurs in somewhat more open and dryer forest dominated by Araucaria and partially cleared landscapes. In elevation it is found from sea level to 1,500 m (4,900 ft).

== Behavior ==
=== Movement ===
The pileated parrot makes some movements between inland and more coastal areas. It is "strikingly nomadic" at Intervales State Park in Brazil's São Paulo state.

=== Feeding ===
Little is known about the pileated parrot's feeding behavior or diet. It is known to feed on fruits and seeds of several families of plants, and also on Eucalyptus bark.

=== Breeding ===
The pileated parrot's nesting season is not fully defined but apparently includes November. It nests in holes in trees. In the wild the clutch size appears to be two eggs. In captivity clutches of three to four are typical. In captivity the female alone incubates, for about 24 days, and fledging occurs 52 to 54 days after hatch.

=== Vocalization ===
The pileated parrot call is "very high, piercing shrieks, like 'tjeéreweét'." Its flight call is a "high 'tjer-tjer'tjer- -'."

== Status ==
The IUCN has assessed the pileated parrot as being of Least Concern. It has a fairly large range but its population size is not known and is believed to be decreasing. No immediate threats have been identified. "Much reduced by extensive habitat loss throughout range, but still persists in reasonable numbers where cover extensive".
