= Canary-winged parakeet =

Canary-winged parakeet is a common name for two closely related parakeet species in the genus, Brotogeris, both native to the Amazon Basin in South America. These are:

- Brotogeris chiriri, the yellow-chevroned parakeet
- Brotogeris versicolurus, the white-winged parakeet
