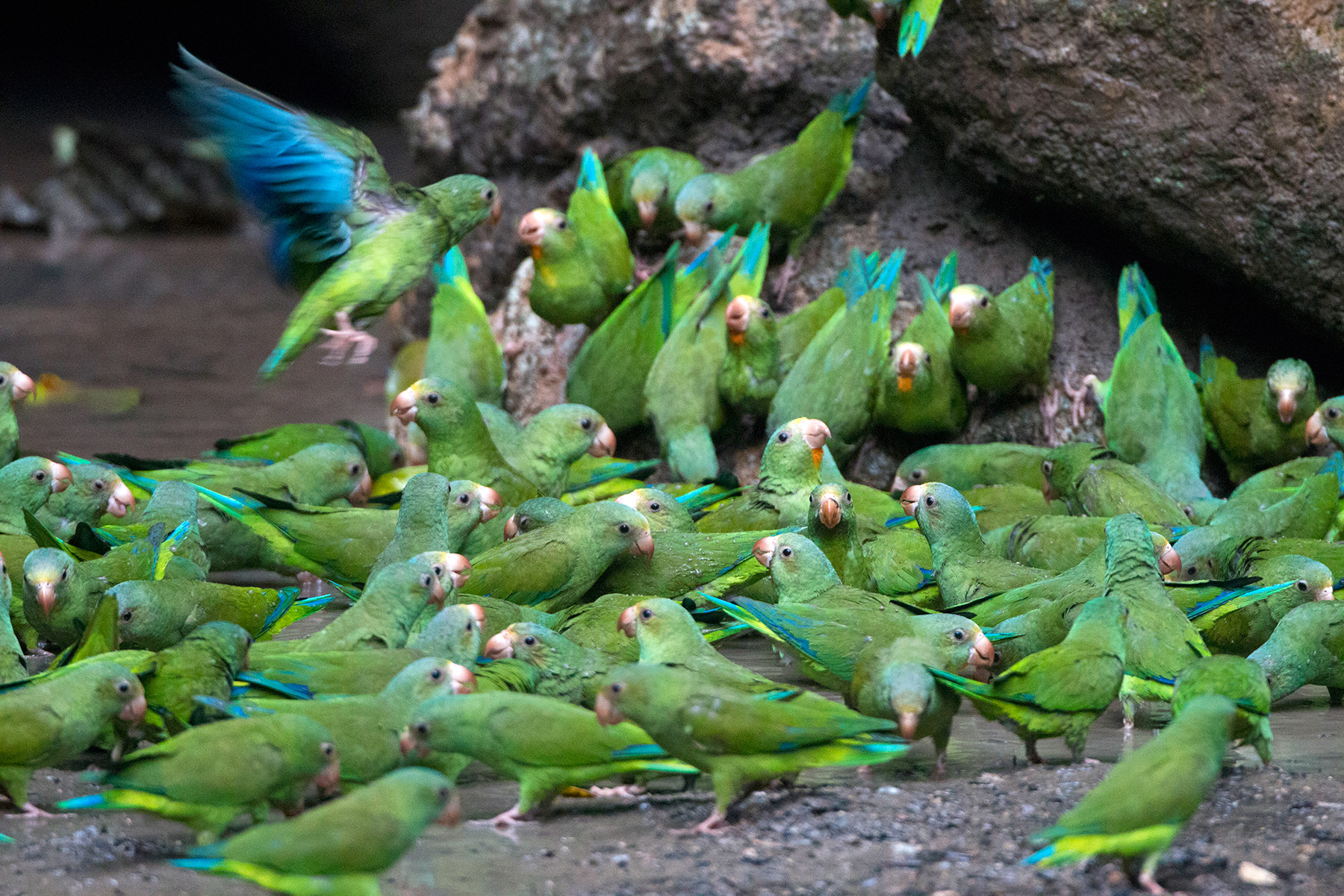

Conservation status
- Least Concern (IUCN 3.1)

Scientific classification
- Kingdom: Animalia
- Phylum: Chordata
- Class: Aves
- Order: Psittaciformes
- Family: Psittacidae
- Genus: Brotogeris
- Species: B. cyanoptera

Binomial name
- Brotogeris cyanoptera (Pelzeln, 1870)

Synonyms
- Brotogeris devillei

= Cobalt-winged parakeet =

Species of bird

The cobalt-winged parakeet (Brotogeris cyanoptera) is a species of bird in subfamily Arinae of the family Psittacidae, the African and New World parrots. It is found in Bolivia, Brazil, Colombia, Ecuador, Guyana, Peru, and Venezuela.

== Taxonomy and systematics ==
The International Ornithological Committee and the Clements taxonomy attribute the first description of the cobalt-winged parakeet to August von Pelzeln, dated 1870. Pelzeln called it Sittace cyanoptera and separated it from what is now the orange-chinned parakeet (Brotogeris jugularis). Peters, in his Check-list of Birds of the World, cited Tommaso Salvadori (1891) as the originator, and this citation is used by BirdLife International's Handbook of the Birds of the World.

The cobalt-winged parakeet has these three subspecies:

- B. c. cyanoptera (Pelzeln, 1870)
- B. c. gustavi Berlepsch, 1889
- B. c. beniensis Gyldenstolpe, 1941

Subspecies B. c. gustavi has been treated as a separate species by some authors. The cobalt-winged and golden-winged parakeet (B. chrysoptera) are sister species.

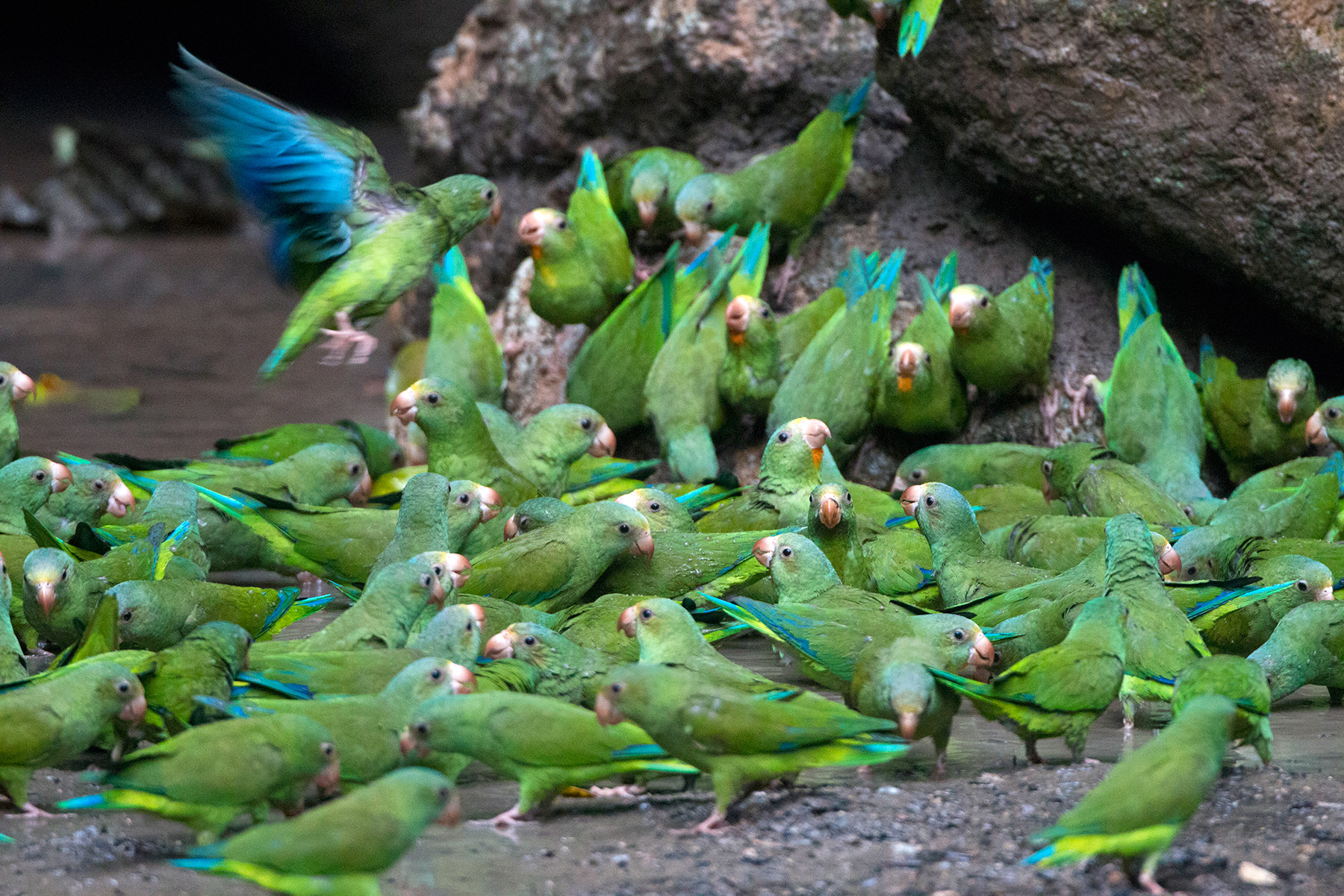
Cobalt-winged parakeets at a clay lick along the Napo River, Ecuador

== Description ==
The cobalt-winged parakeet is 18 to 20 cm (7.1 to 7.9 in) long and weighs an average of 67 g (2.4 oz). The species is almost entirely green that is darker on its upperparts. Adults of the nominate subspecies B. c. cyanoptera have a yellowish forehead, an orange chin, and a blue tinge on their crown and nape. Their flight feathers are blue; their central tail feathers are also blue and the rest are green. Immature birds are a duller version of the adult. Subspecies B. c. gustavi has very little blue on its head and a yellow edge on the carpals. B. c. beniensis is paler than the nominate with a similar amount of blue on its head and a yellow carpal edge like gustavi.

== Distribution and habitat ==
The subspecies of the cobalt-winged parakeet are found thus:

- B. c. cyanoptera, the upper Amazon Basin in eastern and southeastern Colombia, southern Venezuela, western Guyana, eastern Ecuador and Peru, northwestern Bolivia, and west-central Brazil
- B. c. gustavi, the upper Huallaga River valley of northern Peru
- B. c. beniensis, northeastern and central Bolivia from Beni to Santa Cruz

The cobalt-winged parakeet inhabits a variety of landscapes including the edges and interior of rainforest, secondary forest, várzea , savanna, and Llanos. In elevation it commonly reaches 1,000 m (3,300 ft) and occasionally 1,350 m (4,400 ft).

== Behavior ==
=== Movement ===
The cobalt-winged parakeet is thought to be mostly sedentary but might make some seasonal elevational movements.

=== Feeding ===
Little is known about the cobalt-winged parakeet's foraging technique and diet. It has been recorded feeding on flowers, fruits, and Cecropia catkins. It also eats mineral-impregnated soil.

=== Breeding ===
The cobalt-winged parakeet's breeding season is not well known but apparently includes June and July in the western part of its range. It nests in tree cavities. Captive pairs lay clutches of about five eggs that hatch in 24 days.

=== Vocalization ===
The cobalt-winged parakeet's common calls are " a high-pitched "klee", shrill "chree" or bisyllabic "chree-chree"" that are given both when perched and in flight. Another call is "a fast chattering series "chichichichichi"." Members of flocks call simultaneously and make "a shrill chattering".

== Status ==
The IUCN has assessed the cobalt-winged parakeet as being of Least Concern. It has a very large range; its population size is not known but is believed to be stable. No immediate threats have been identified. It is "[c]ommon throughout range...with no recent evidence of trade, hence rare in captivity."
