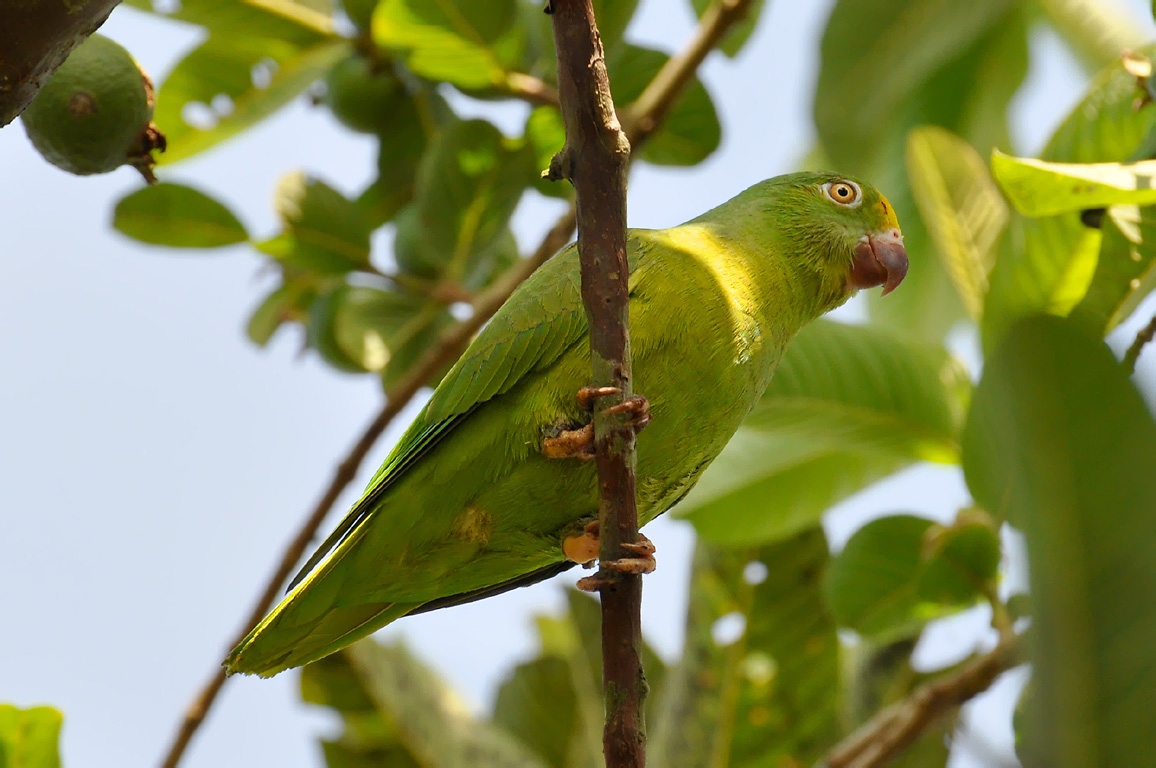
- At Uarini, Amazonas, Brazil

Conservation status
- Least Concern (IUCN 3.1)

Scientific classification
- Kingdom: Animalia
- Phylum: Chordata
- Class: Aves
- Order: Psittaciformes
- Family: Psittacidae
- Genus: Brotogeris
- Species: B. sanctithomae

Binomial name
- Brotogeris sanctithomae (Müller, 1776)

= Tui parakeet =

Species of bird

The tui parakeet (Brotogeris sanctithomae) is a species of bird in subfamily Arinae of the family Psittacidae, the African and New World parrots. It is found in Bolivia, Brazil, Colombia, Peru, and possibly Ecuador.

== Taxonomy and systematics ==
The tui parakeet shares genus Brotogeris with seven other species of parakeets. It has two subspecies, the nominate B. s. sanctithomae (Müller, 1776) and B. s. takatsukasae (Neumann, 1931).

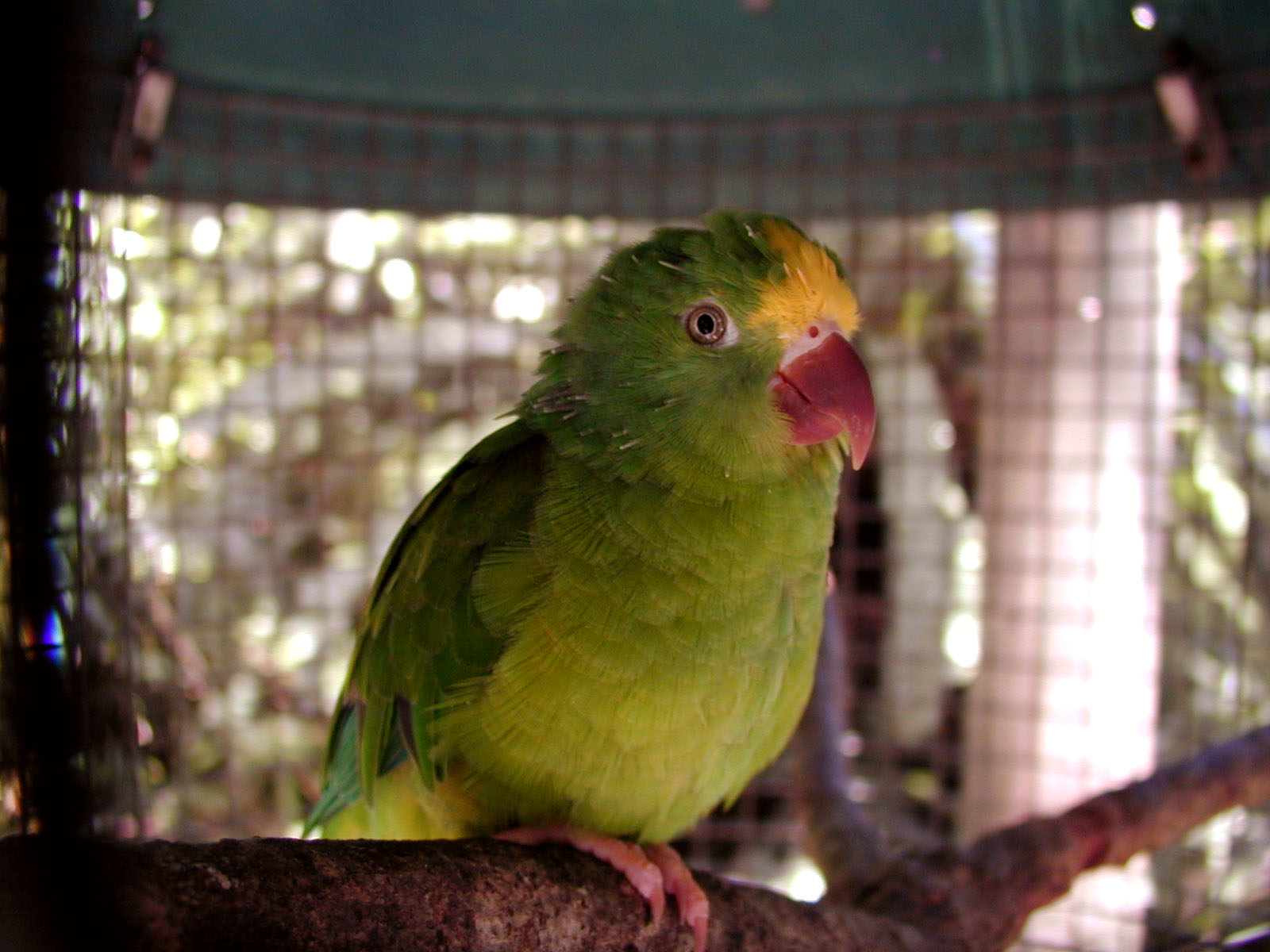
A captive tui parakeet

== Description ==
The tui parakeet is 17 to 19 cm (6.7 to 7.5 in) long and weighs an average of 59 g (2.1 oz). Adults are mostly green that is yellower on the rump and underparts. They have yellow lores and forehead and a bluish tinge on the face. Their primaries are a darker green than the body and bluish on their underside. Their bill is brown. Subspecies B. s. takatsukasae differs from the nominate only by adding a yellow streak behind the eye. Immature birds are essentially the same as adults.

== Distribution and habitat ==
The nominate subspecies of the tui parakeet is found in the Amazon Basin of extreme southeastern Colombia, eastern Peru, northern Bolivia, and Brazil east to the Rio Madeira. Undocumented sight records in eastern Ecuador lead the South American Classification Committee of the American Ornithological Society to treat it as hypothetical in that country. Subspecies B. s. takatsukasae is found along the lower Amazon from the Rio Madeira and Rio Negro to the Atlantic at the Amazon's mouth. The species mostly inhabits semi-open landscapes like secondary forest, grasslands with some woodlands, riverbanks and islands with dense scrub, and the edges of várzea forest.

== Behavior ==
=== Movement ===
The tui parakeet is believed to be sedentary.

=== Feeding ===
The tui parakeet feeds on fruit and blossoms from a variety of plants including palms. It also feeds in manioc and sugarcane plantations.

=== Breeding ===
The tui parakeet's breeding season is not well defined but appears to be April to July in Colombia. Nest cavities in arboreal termite nests have been documented. One nest held six nestlings. The typical range of clutch size, the incubation period, the time to fledging, and details of parental care are not known.

=== Vocalization ===
The tui parakeet's calls include "a high-pitched "klee", shrill "chree" or bisyllabic "chree-chree" [and a] fast chattering series "cra-cra-cra-cra-cra"." Members of a flock often call simultaneously.

== Status ==
The IUCN has assessed the tui parakeet as being of Least Concern. It has a large range, and though its population size is not known it is believed to be stable. No immediate threats have been identified. "Locally abundant with very little habitat loss, Brazil, and equally common within the limited areas occupied in Colombia, Peru and Bolivia."
