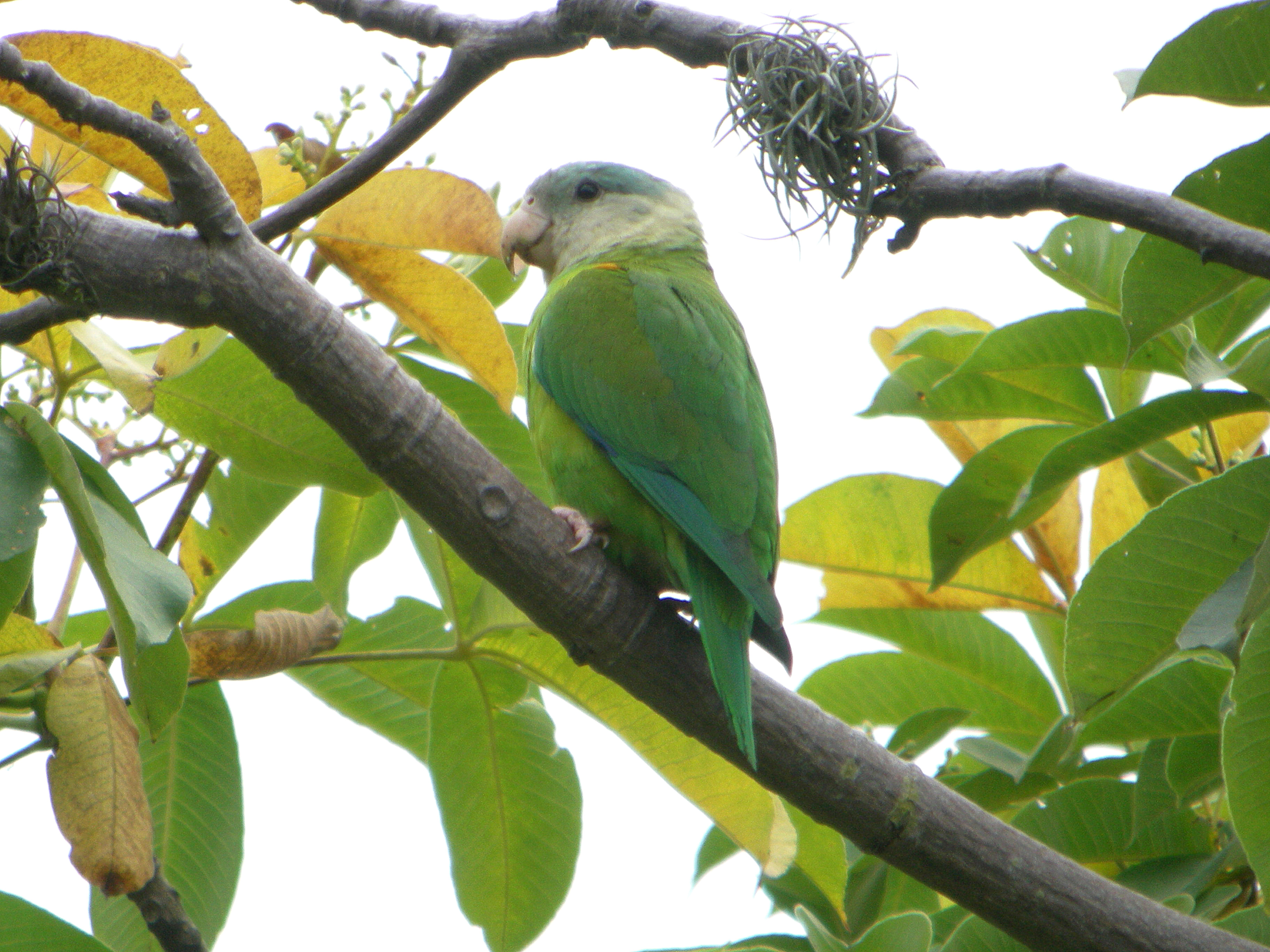

Conservation status
- Vulnerable (IUCN 3.1)
- CITES Appendix II

Scientific classification
- Kingdom: Animalia
- Phylum: Chordata
- Class: Aves
- Order: Psittaciformes
- Family: Psittacidae
- Genus: Brotogeris
- Species: B. pyrrhoptera

Binomial name
- Brotogeris pyrrhoptera (Latham, 1801)

= Grey-cheeked parakeet =

Species of bird

The grey-cheeked parakeet (Brotogeris pyrrhoptera), less commonly known as fire-winged parakeet, is a vulnerable species of bird. It is in the subfamily Arinae of the family Psittacidae, the African and New World parrots, and is found in Ecuador and Peru.

== Taxonomy and systematics ==
The grey-cheeked parakeet was described and named by John Latham in 1801. It is monotypic. It and the orange-chinned parakeet (B. jugularis) are sister species.

== Description ==
The grey-cheeked parakeet is 19 to 20.5 cm (7.5 to 8.1 in) long and weighs between 60 and 68 g (2.1 and 2.4 oz). Adults are mostly green that is paler and yellower on the underparts. They have a pale blue crown, pale ashy gray cheeks and sides of the neck, and a whitish eye ring and bill. Their primary coverts are deep blue and their underwing coverts orange to orange-red. Immature birds have green instead of blue crowns.

== Distribution and habitat ==
The grey-cheeked parakeet is found from western Ecuador's Manabí Province south into extreme northwestern Peru as far as the northern part of the Department of Piura. It inhabits a variety of landscapes including both deciduous and evergreen forests and more open woodlands, and also scrublands and cultivated areas. In elevation in ranges only as high as 300 m (1,000 ft) in the northern part of its range but up to 1,550 m (5,100 ft) in the south.

== Behavior ==
=== Movement ===
The grey-cheeked parakeet is thought to make some seasonal movements.

=== Feeding ===
The grey-cheeked parakeet's diet includes flowers, seeds, and fruits of a variety of plants and it is suspected to feed on cultivated bananas as well.

=== Breeding ===
The grey-cheeked parakeet's breeding season appears to be concentrated from January to March. It often nests in natural cavities in large hollow tree limbs but also excavates nests in arboreal termite nests. In captivity the clutch size is four to seven eggs and young fledge about six weeks after hatch.

=== Vocalization ===
The grey-cheeked parakeet is "[n]oisy, giving a variety of rather shrill, chattering calls." Some have been described as "chree", "chree-chree" and "cra-cra-cra-cra-cra". Members of a flock often call simultaneously.

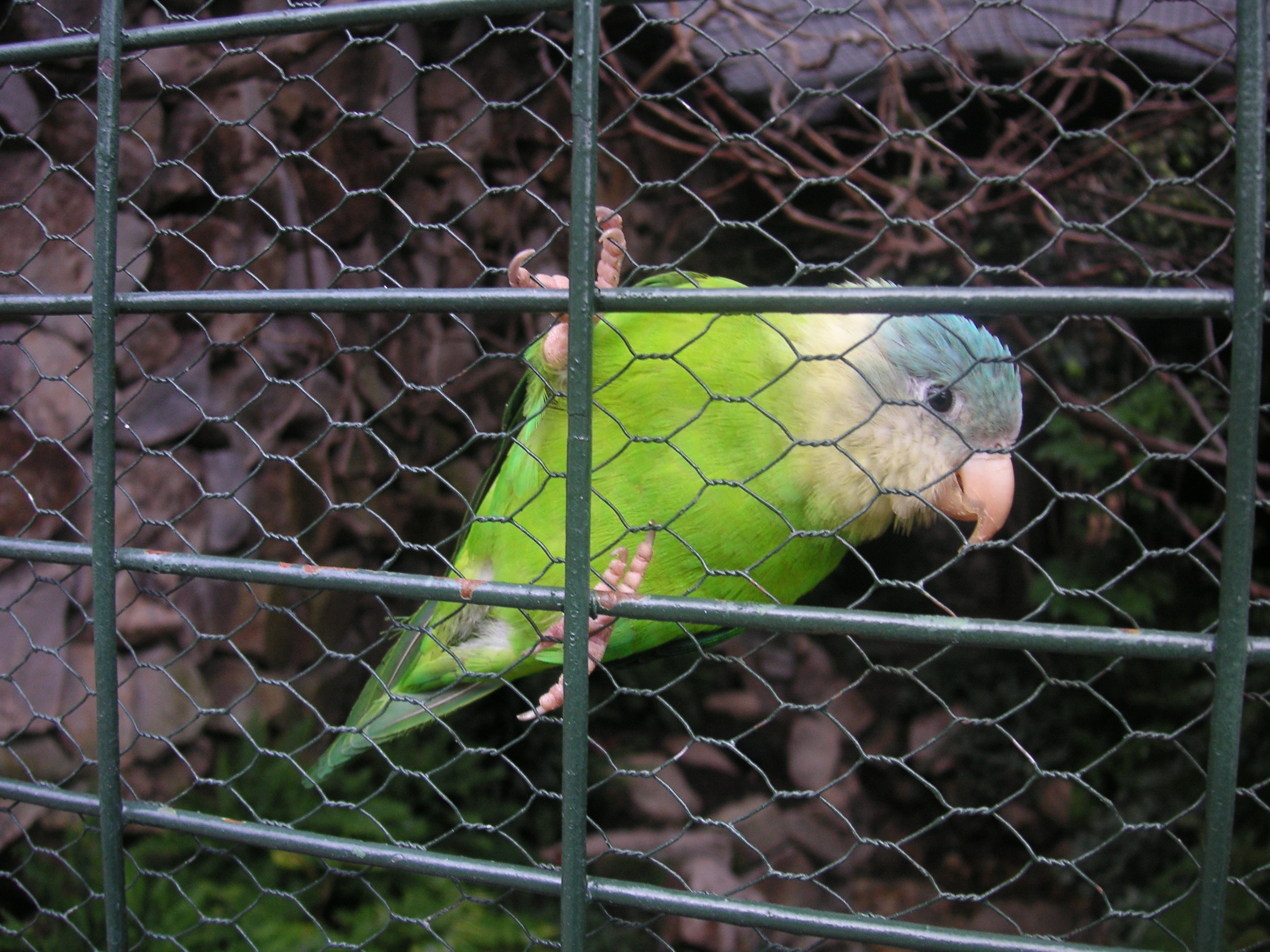
In captivity in Cuenca, Ecuador

== Aviculture ==
Even in its native home, the grey-cheeked parakeet is widely kept as a pet. With patience, these birds may be taught to mimic human sounds, albeit without the clarity of larger parrots.

== Status ==
The IUCN originally assessed the grey-cheeked parakeet as Threatened, then in 2000 as Endangered, but since 2021 it has been downlisted to Vulnerable. It has a limited range and its estimated population of 10,000 mature individuals is believed to be decreasing. "The illegal cage-bird trade and habitat loss are the principal threats." "Natural habitats are being destroyed through agricultural conversion, logging and grazing by goats and cattle, which prevents forest regeneration, seriously threatens deciduous forests and possibly depletes suitable nesting sites." The export of grey-cheeked parrots is banned in both Ecuador and Peru, and the species occurs in at least four protected areas.
