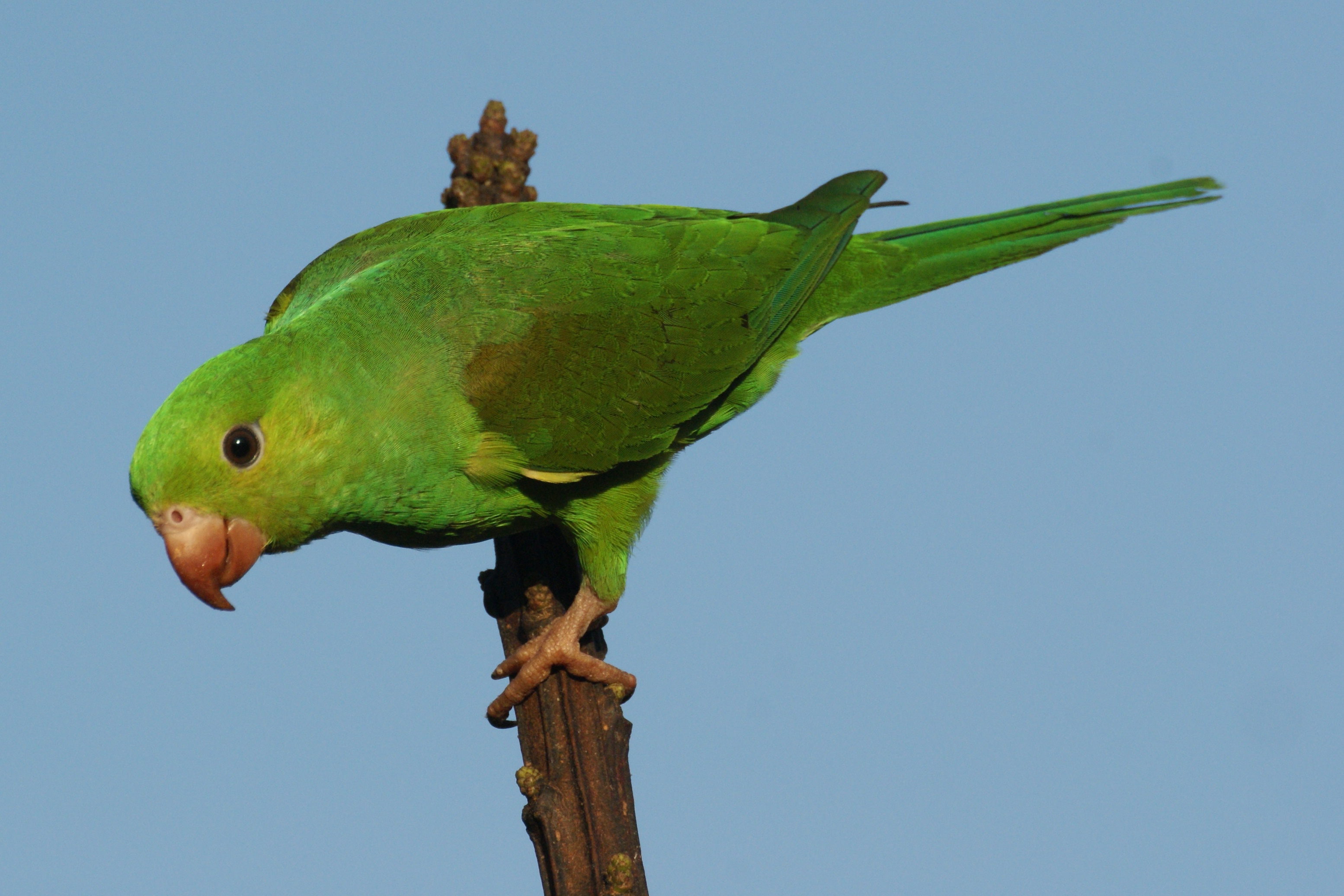
- In Paraná, Brazil

Conservation status
- Least Concern (IUCN 3.1)

Scientific classification
- Kingdom: Animalia
- Phylum: Chordata
- Class: Aves
- Order: Psittaciformes
- Family: Psittacidae
- Genus: Brotogeris
- Species: B. tirica

Binomial name
- Brotogeris tirica (Gmelin, JF, 1788)

= Plain parakeet =

Species of bird

The plain parakeet (Brotogeris tirica) is a species of bird in subfamily Arinae of the family Psittacidae, the African and New World parrots. It is endemic to Brazil.

== Taxonomy and systematics ==
The plain parakeet was formally described in 1788 by the German naturalist Johann Friedrich Gmelin in his revised and expanded edition of Carl Linnaeus's Systema Naturae. He placed it with all the other parrots in the genus Psittacus and coined the binomial name Psittacus tirica. The type locality was subsequently designated as Brazil. The plain parakeet is now placed with seven other parakeets in genus Brotogeris that was introduced in 1825 by Irish zoologist Nicholas Aylward Vigors. The genus name is from the Ancient Greek brotogērus meaning "with human voice". The specific epithet tirica is from the Tupi language tiriba meaning "tinkling". The word was used for a parakeet. The species is monotypic: no subspecies are recognized.

== Description ==
The plain parakeet is 23 to 25 cm (9.1 to 9.8 in) long and weighs about 63 g (2.2 oz). Adults have an essentially all green body, though their nape has a bluish tinge and their undersides have a yellowish one. Their shoulder is bronzy or brownish green and their flight feathers and the underside of their tail are bluish green. Their bill is pinkish with a paler base. Immature birds are similar to adults but with less blue in the wings and a shorter tail. The population in São Paulo state has many individuals with a blue mutation.

== Distribution and habitat ==
The plain parakeet is found in eastern Brazil from Alagoas south to Santa Catarina with an isolated population in Rio Grande do Sul. It inhabits the Atlantic Forest biome, where it occurs in secondary forest, cultivated land with groves of trees, plantations, and urban parks. It is common in cities "including the huge metropolises of Rio de Janeiro and São Paulo". Towards the higher elevations inland it also is found in the edges and canopy of montane rainforest. In elevation it is mostly in the lowlands but can be found as high as 1,200 m (3,900 ft).

== Behavior ==
=== Movement ===
The plain parakeet makes some local seasonal movements, but they are not fully defined.

=== Feeding ===
A plain parakeet feeds mainly on seeds, fruit, flowers, and nectar from a very wide variety of plants and trees. It also takes some adult and larval insects.

=== Breeding ===
The plain parakeet's breeding season is believed to be from September to December but possibly begins earlier and ends later. It nests in cavities in trees. In captivity the clutch size is four eggs, the incubation period about 26 days, and fledging at seven weeks after hatch.

=== Vocalization ===
The plain parakeet's calls include "a rather high-pitched shrill "cree" or bisyllabic "cra-creep", and a lower-pitched, harsh-sounding "cra-cra-cra"" that are given both from a perch and in flight. Members of a flock often call simultaneously.

== Status ==
The IUCN has assessed the plain parakeet as being of Least Concern. Though it has a somewhat limited range and its population size is not known, the latter is believed to be stable. No immediate threats have been identified. "Tolerates changes far more than any other parrot endemic to SE Brazil [and] present in many protected areas."

== Gallery ==
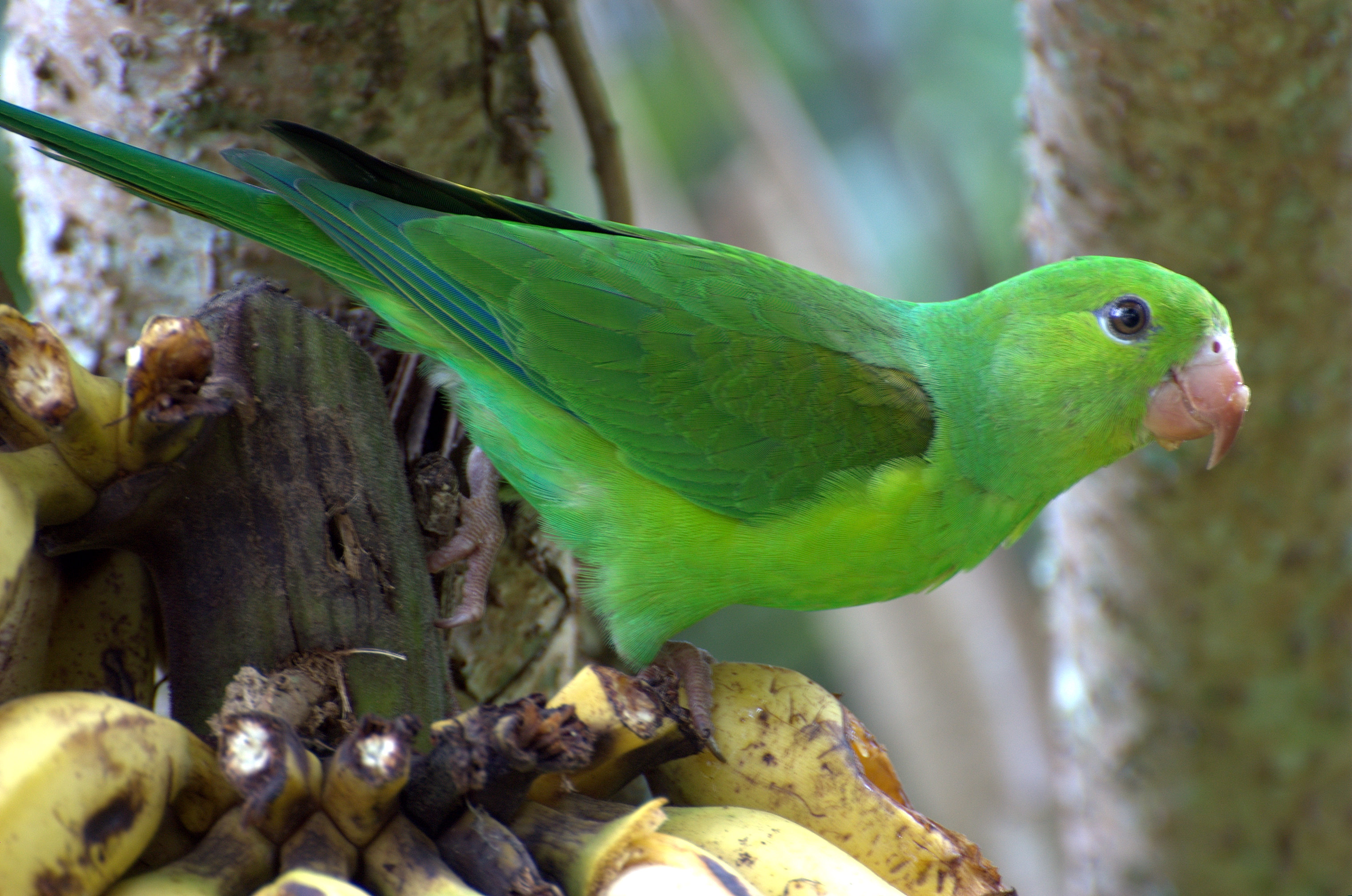

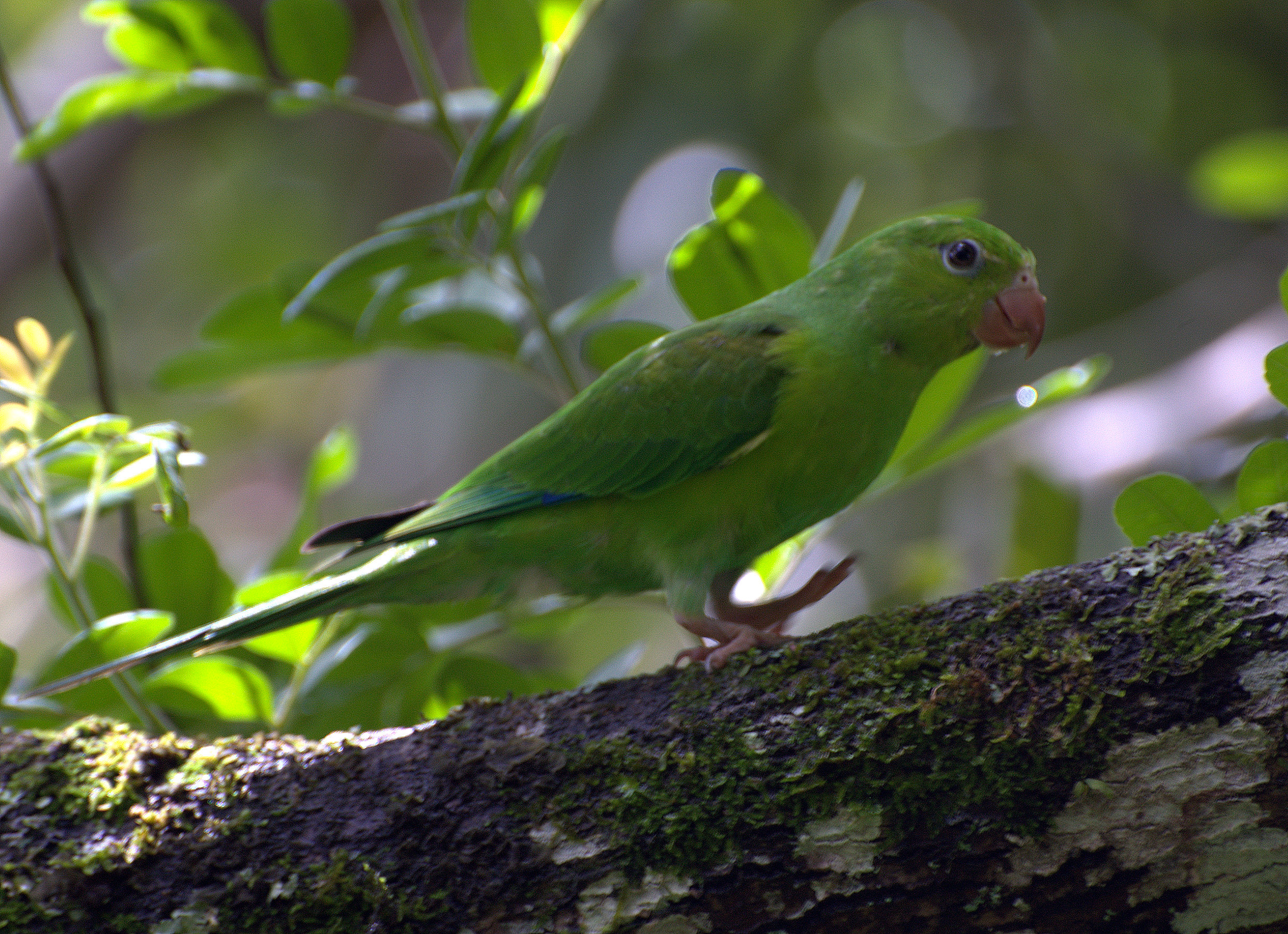

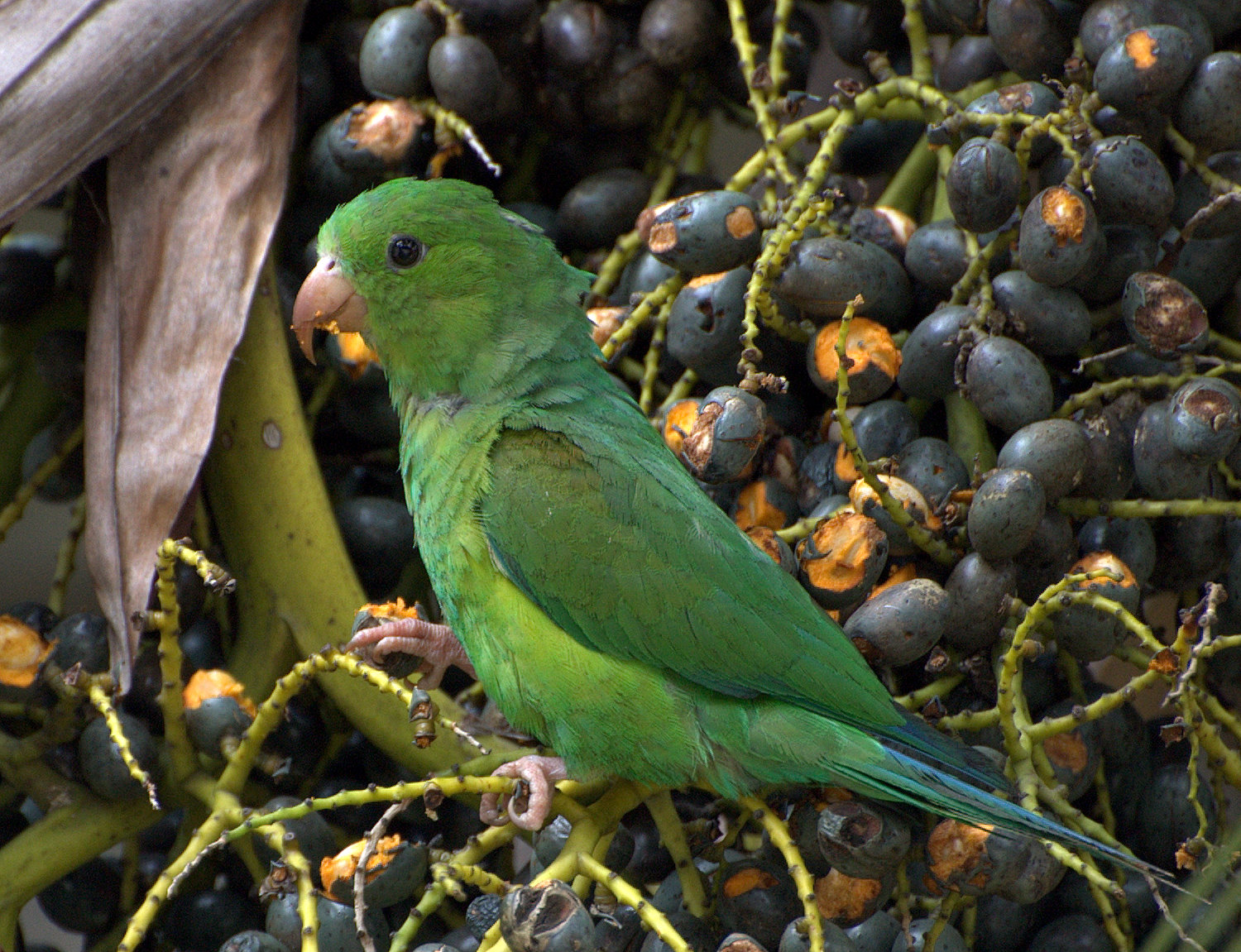
