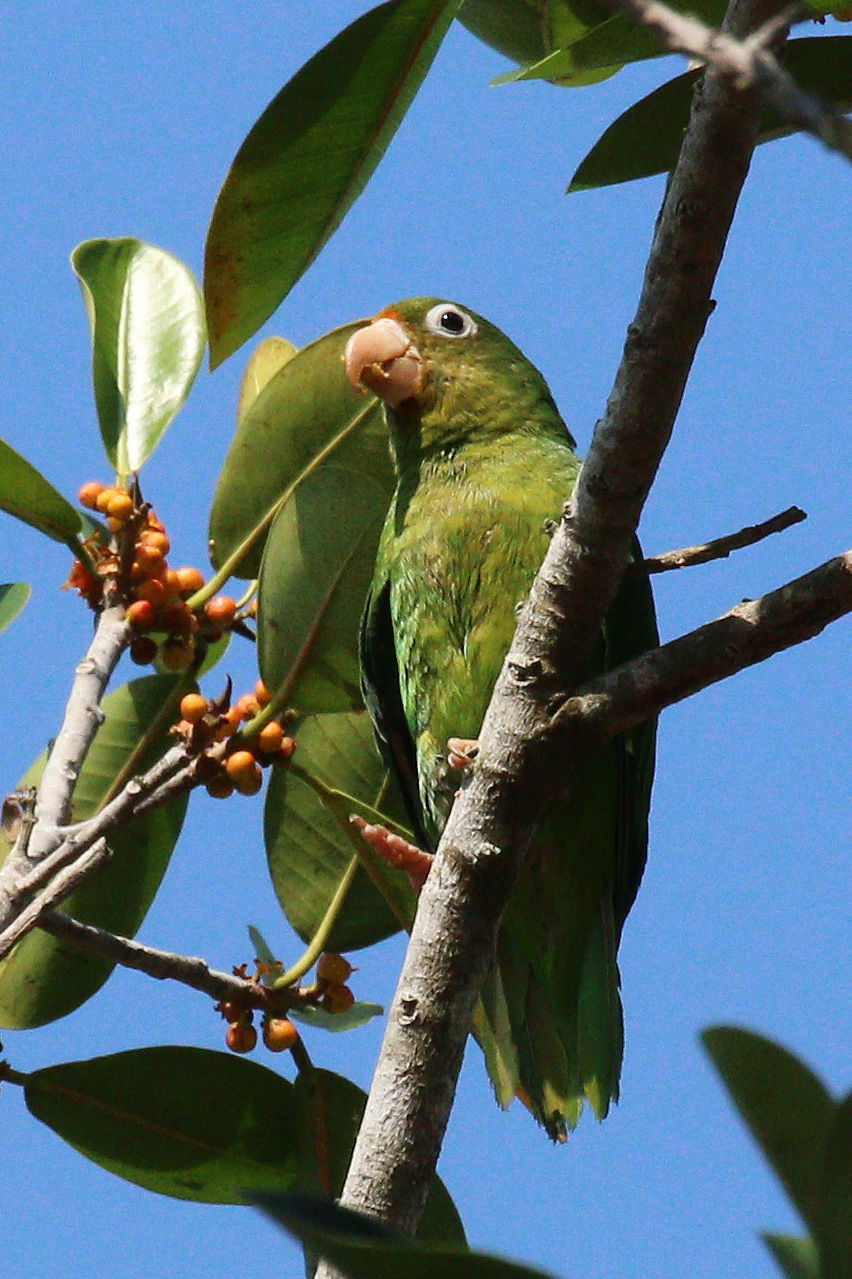
- at Cristalino Lodge, Southern Amazon, Brazil

Conservation status
- Least Concern (IUCN 3.1)

Scientific classification
- Kingdom: Animalia
- Phylum: Chordata
- Class: Aves
- Order: Psittaciformes
- Family: Psittacidae
- Genus: Brotogeris
- Species: B. chrysoptera

Binomial name
- Brotogeris chrysoptera (Linnaeus, 1766)

Synonyms
- Psittacus chrysopterus Linnaeus, 1766

= Golden-winged parakeet =

Species of bird

The golden-winged parakeet (Brotogeris chrysoptera) is a species of bird in subfamily Arinae of the family Psittacidae, the African and New World parrots. It is found in Bolivia, Brazil, French Guiana, Guyana, Suriname, and Venezuela.

== Taxonomy and systematics ==
The golden-winged parakeet was formally described in 1766 by the Swedish naturalist Carl Linnaeus in the twelfth edition of his Systema Naturae. He placed it with all the other parrots in the genus Psittacus and coined the binomial name Psittacus chrysopterus. Linnaeus based his description on the "golden-winged parakeet" that had been described and illustrated in 1760 by the English naturalist George Edwards in the second volume of his Gleanings of Natural History. Edwards was uncertain about the origin of his specimen. Linnaeus specified the type location as "India". It was redesignated as "Guiana" in 1912. The golden-winged parakeet is now one of eight species placed in the genus Brotogeris that was introduced in 1925 by Irish zoologist Nicholas Aylward Vigors. The genus name is from the Ancient Greek brotogērus meaning "with human voice". The specific epithet chrysoptera is from the Ancient Greek khrusopteros meaning "golden-winged" (from khrusos "gold" and pteron "wing").

Five subspecies of golden-winged parakeet are recognized:

- B. c. chrysoptera (Linnaeus, 1766)
- B. c. tenuifrons Friedmann, 1945
- B. c. solimoensis Gyldenstolpe, 1941
- B. c. tuipara (Gmelin, JF, 1788)
- B. c. chrysosema Sclater, PL, 1864

B. c. solimoensis has sometimes been included in the nominate B. c. chrysoptera. Subspecies B. c. tuipara and B. c. chrysosema have sometimes been treated as separate species. The golden-winged and cobalt-winged parakeet (B. cyanoptera) are sister species.

== Description ==
The golden-winged parakeet is about 16 cm (6.3 in) long and weighs 47 to 80 g (1.7 to 2.8 oz). The species is almost entirely green. Adults of the nominate subspecies have a browish frontal band above the bill, and orange-brown spot on the chin, and bright orange primary coverts. Subspecies B. c. tuipara has an orange frontal band and chin and yellow edges on the outer tail feathers. B. c. chrysosema has a yellowish orange frontal band and yellow primary coverts. B. c. solimoensis is like chrysosema but with a paler frontal band. B. c. tenuifrons has yellow edges on the outer tail feathers like tuipara but no frontal band. Immature birds have entirely green wings.

== Distribution and habitat ==
The subspecies of the golden-winged parakeet are found thus:

- B. c. chrysoptera, from northeastern Venezuela southeast through the Guianas and into adjoining north-central Brazil
- B. c. tenuifrons, along the upper Rio Negro in northwestern Brazil
- B. c. solimoensis, north-central Brazil along the middle Amazon between the municipality of Codajás and Manaus
- B. c. tuipara, north-central Brazil south of the Amazon between the Tapajós River and the Atlantic coast in Maranhão
- B. c. chrysosema, along the Madeira River and its tributaries from northeastern Bolivia into western Brazil's Mato Grosso state

In most of its range the golden-winged parakeet inhabits undisturbed lowland rainforest, secondary forest, savanna, coastal woodlands, and towns (as long as there are tall trees). North of the Orinoco River in Venezuela it inhabits cloudforest as high as 1,200 m (3,900 ft).

== Behavior ==
=== Movement ===
The golden-winged parakeet is mostly sedentary but there are suggestions of some irregular wandering.

=== Feeding ===
The golden-winged parakeet feeds mostly on flowers and their nectar; a wide variety of plant families provide them. It also feeds on seeds, berries, palm fruits, and insects and snails in still water.

=== Breeding ===
The golden-winged parakeet's nesting season varies geographically; it nests somewhere in almost any month. It nests in a cavity, natural or excavated, in a tree or arboreal termite nest. The clutch size is three or four eggs. The incubation period, time to fledging, and details of parental care are not known.

=== Vocalization ===
The golden-winged parakeet's common calls are "a high-pitched "klee", shrill "chree" or bisyllabic "chree-chree"" that are given both from a perch and in flight. It also makes "a fast chattering series "cra-cra-cra-cra-cra"." Members of flocks in flight often call simultaneously, making a cacophony.

== Status ==
The IUCN has assessed the golden-winged parakeet as being of Least Concern. It has a very large range but its population size is not known and is believed to be decreasing. No immediate threats have been identified. "Locally common to abundant, even in cities, in all range states, and is relatively little traded."
