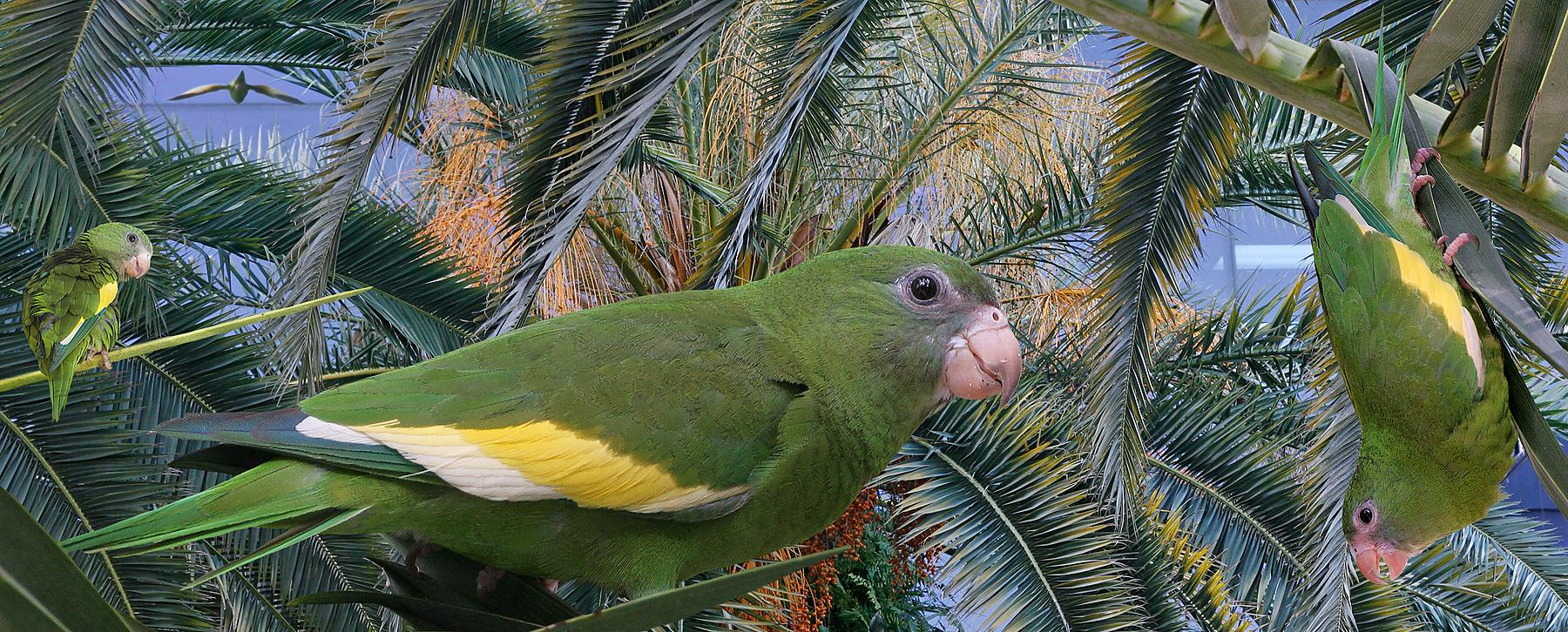

Conservation status
- Least Concern (IUCN 3.1)

Scientific classification
- Kingdom: Animalia
- Phylum: Chordata
- Class: Aves
- Order: Psittaciformes
- Family: Psittacidae
- Genus: Brotogeris
- Species: B. versicolurus

Binomial name
- Brotogeris versicolurus (Müller, 1776)

= White-winged parakeet =

Species of bird

The white-winged parakeet (Brotogeris versicolurus), or canary-winged parakeet is a small parrot native to the Amazon River basin from southeast Colombia to the rivers mouth in Brazil. Caged birds have been released and the birds have established self-sustaining populations in Lima, Peru, Los Angeles, and Miami, Florida areas of the United States, and in Puerto Rico. They were also present in San Francisco, California until the mid-2000s. Although feral birds are showing some recent declines as nesters in the United States, they seem to be doing well in their native habitat.

== Description ==
The white-winged parakeet typically is 22 cm in length, and is mostly green in color. It has a trailing yellow edge on its folded wings. Its most distinguished characteristic is the white wing patches most noticed when the bird is in flight. It is closely related to the yellow-chevroned parakeet, and the two have often been considered conspecific.

== Behaviour ==
In captivity, these birds often have a close relationship with their human handlers. They enjoy spending time in physical contact with their owners, often riding around on shoulders or nesting in hair. They can have loud calls when not within sight of their "flock", but are generally quiet, otherwise. They are adept climbers and enjoy a myriad of challenges. They are an adaptable species and are less picky than others about their available food options. They are not the strongest talkers, but are adept whistlers.

=== Food and feeding ===
The white-winged parakeet feeds mostly on fruit and seeds in its native habitat, and feral populations have adapted to take in blossoms and nectar. Feral birds also come to bird feeders. Wild birds primarily use disturbed forest and forest clearings around settlements. They rarely use deep tropical forest.

In captivity, a pelleted or seed diet is acceptable, supplemented with fresh fruits and vegetables and freshly sprouted seeds.

=== Breeding ===
The white-winged parakeet usually finds a hole in a tree in which to nest. It may also take over termite tunnels and excavate them for their own purposes.

Clutches usually consist of three to five white eggs, which hatch after about 26 days of incubation. Young fledge between six and seven weeks of age, and are fully weaned around nine weeks. After raising their young, all birds form rather large communal roosts until the next breeding season.
