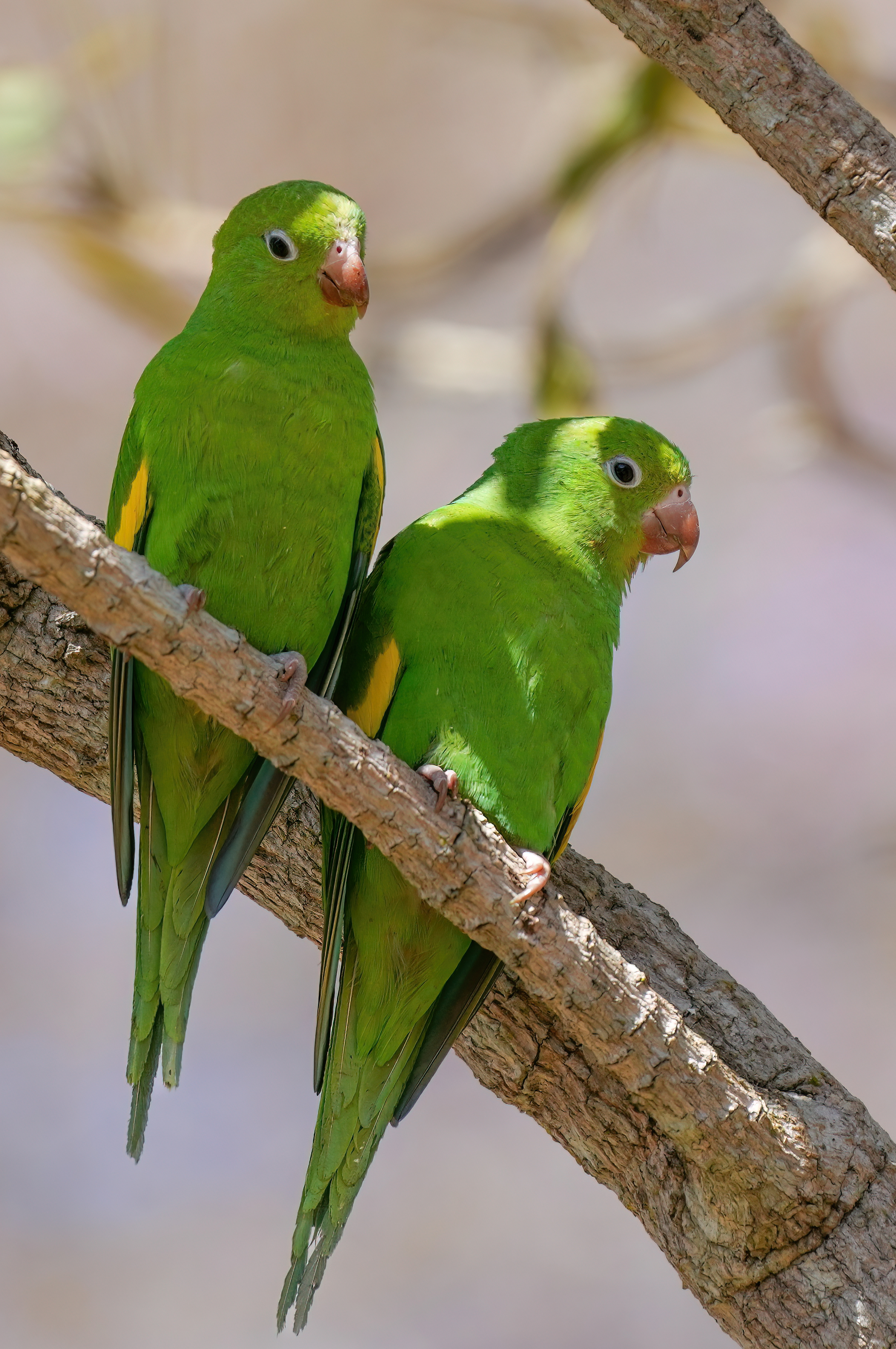
- A pair in Encontro das Águas State Park, Brazil.

Conservation status
- Least Concern (IUCN 3.1)

Scientific classification
- Kingdom: Animalia
- Phylum: Chordata
- Class: Aves
- Order: Psittaciformes
- Family: Psittacidae
- Genus: Brotogeris
- Species: B. chiriri

Binomial name
- Brotogeris chiriri (Vieillot, 1818)

= Yellow-chevroned parakeet =

Species of bird

The yellow-chevroned parakeet (Brotogeris chiriri) is native to tropical South America south of the Amazon River basin from central Brazil to southern Bolivia, Paraguay, and northern Argentina. Caged birds have been released in some areas, and the birds have established self-sustaining populations in Miami, Florida, and Los Angeles. A small population in San Francisco, California that mostly centered around Mission Dolores Park disappeared in the early 2000s. This bird seems to be doing better in its North American feral population than the closely related white-winged parakeet. The species is also established in the downtown area of Rio de Janeiro, Brazil; and in Buenos Aires, Argentina; where it was introduced. The native population in South America continues to do well.

== Description ==
The bird is 20–25 cm in length, and is mostly light green in color. It has a trailing yellow edge on its folded wings, which is also seen when the bird is in flight. It was considered conspecific with the white-winged parakeet until 1997. Wild birds primarily use disturbed forests and forest clearings around settlements. They rarely use deep tropical forests.

== Diet ==
The bird feeds mostly on seeds and fruit in its native habitat, and feral populations have adapted to eat blossoms and nectar. During dry periods, which often leads to fruit scarcity, the bird adapts by eating more seeds, particularly from the plant Erythrina dominguezii. They also consume Bombacaceae trees, commonly known as silk cotton trees, which is the most popular food choice for the parakeet. These birds have been observed participating in geophagia, the deliberate ingestion of soil, commonly in location of clay licks. Feral birds also come to bird feeders. Yellow-chevroned parakeets also consume arboreal termite nests, which are made of a mixture of clay and organic matter, as well as termite feces and saliva that acts as glue for the nest. The termite nests appear to provide more physiological benefits than ordinary ground soil, including macronutrients like potassium, magnesium, and aluminum, which may help with egg formation during the breeding season.

== Breeding ==
Yellow-chevroned parakeets usually find holes in trees for nesting. They also form nesting tunnels in dead palm fronds. The female lays four to five eggs. After raising their young, all birds form rather large communal roosts until the next breeding season.

== Gallery ==
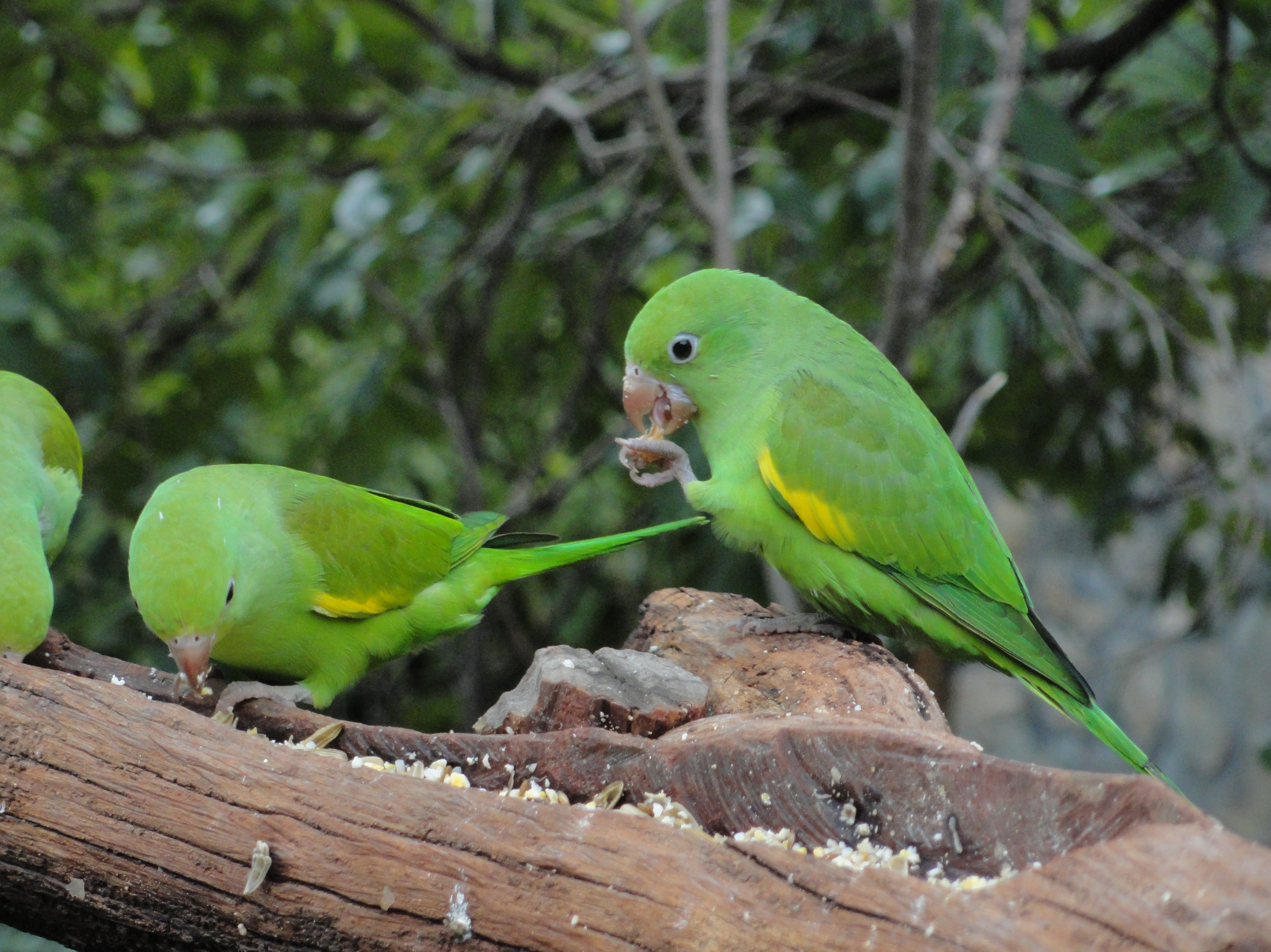

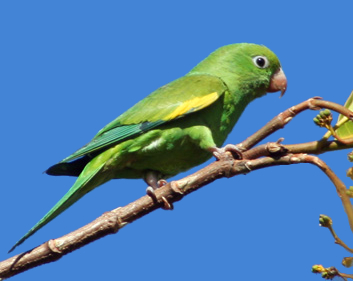

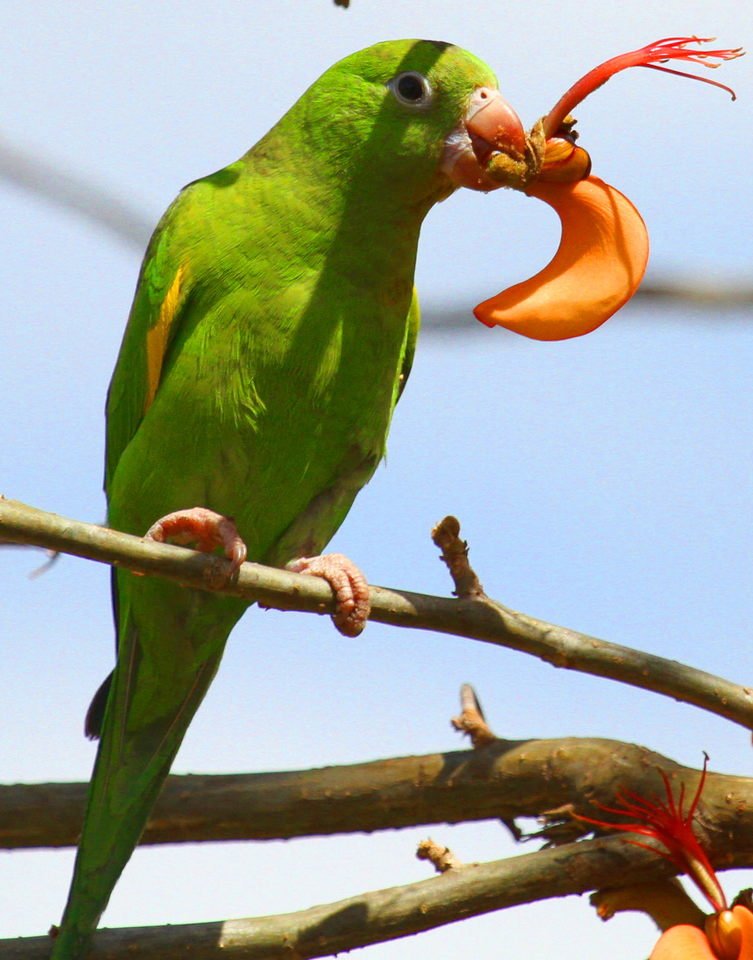

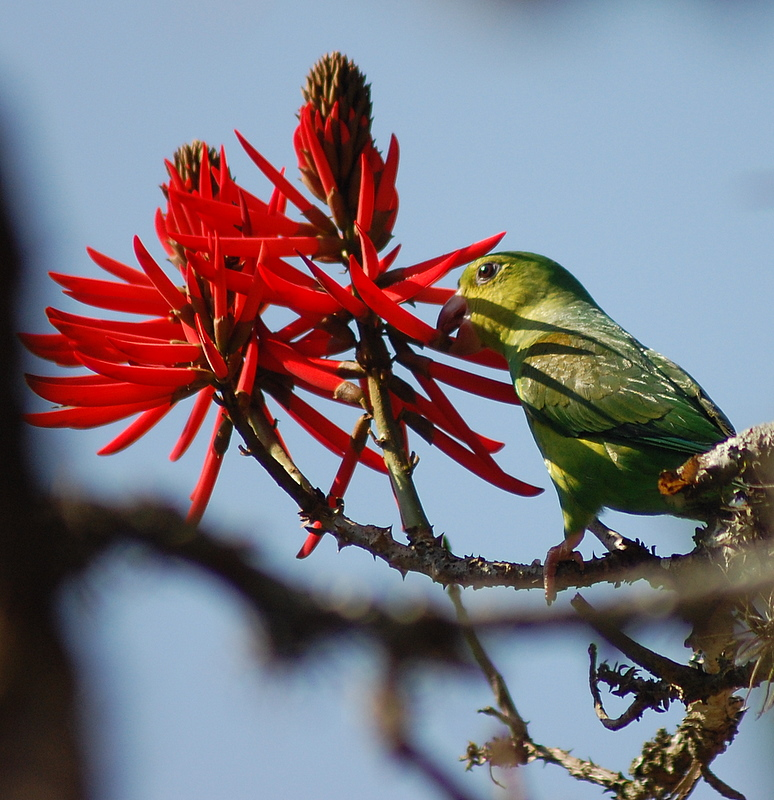

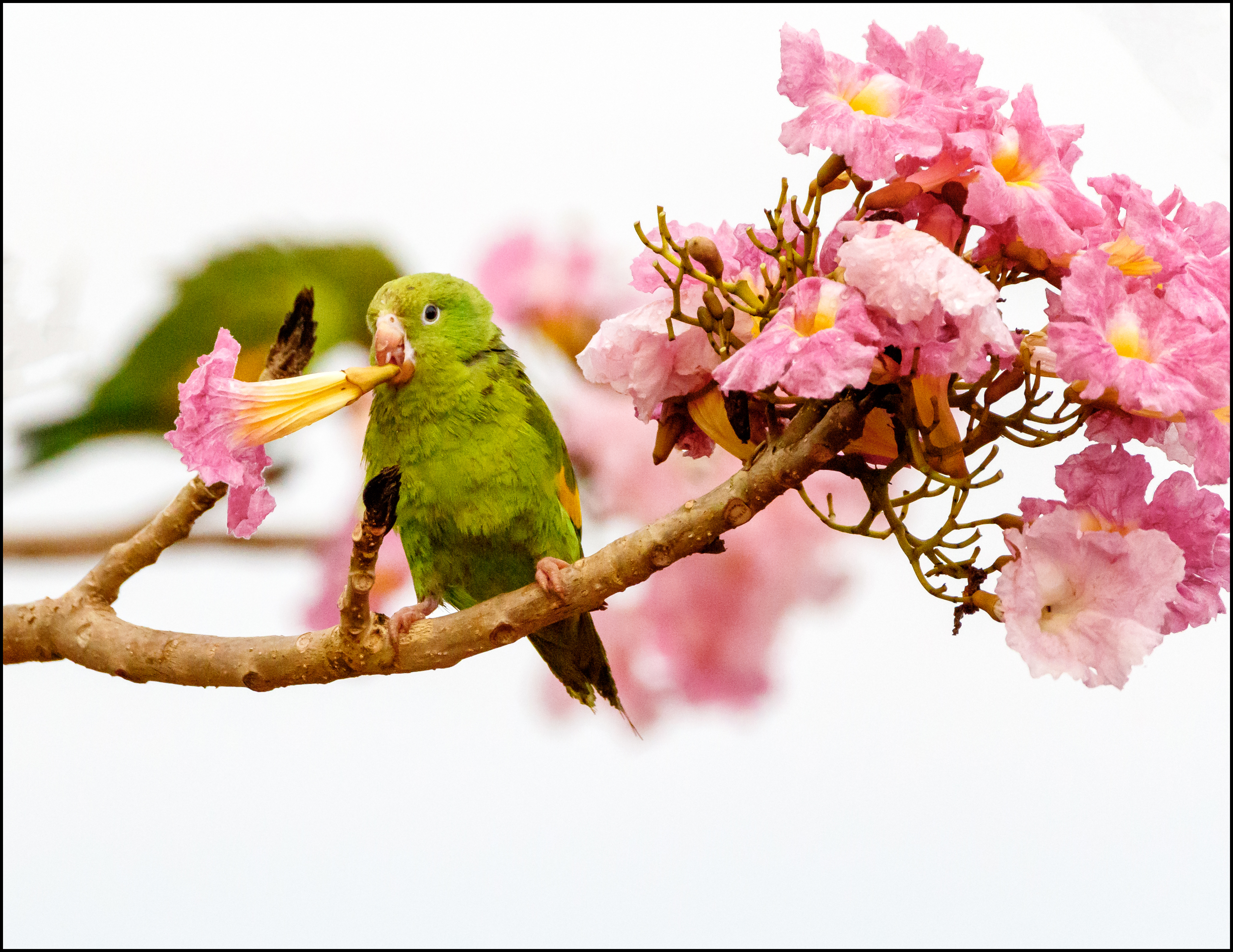

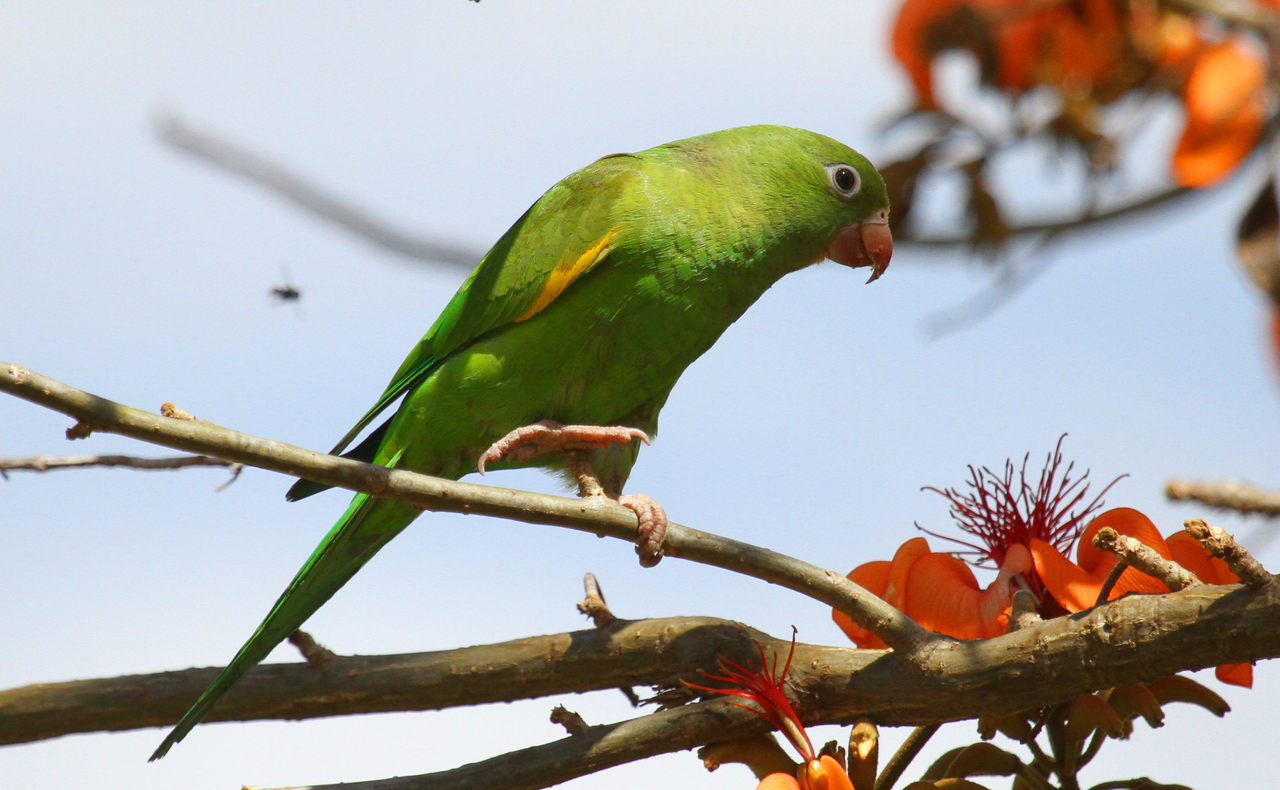
