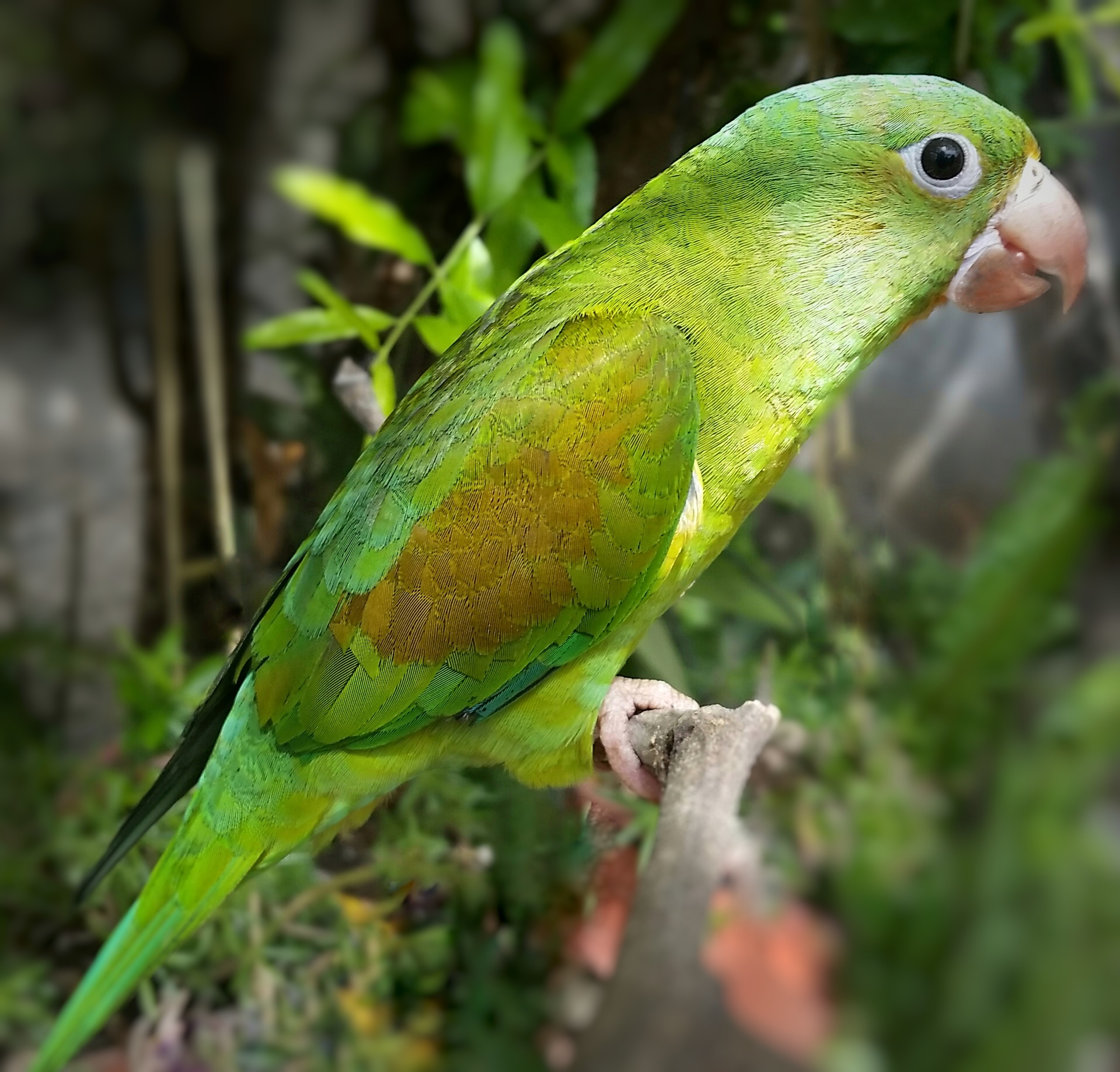
- Male specimen in Honduras

Conservation status
- Least Concern (IUCN 3.1)

Scientific classification
- Kingdom: Animalia
- Phylum: Chordata
- Class: Aves
- Order: Psittaciformes
- Family: Psittacidae
- Genus: Brotogeris
- Species: B. jugularis

Binomial name
- Brotogeris jugularis (Müller, 1776)

= Orange-chinned parakeet =

Species of bird

The orange-chinned parakeet (Brotogeris jugularis), also known as the Tovi parakeet, is a species of bird in subfamily Arinae of the family Psittacidae, the African and New World parrots. It is found from southern Mexico through Central America into Colombia and Venezuela.

== Taxonomy and systematics ==
The orange-chinned parakeet has two subspecies, the nominate B. j. jugularis (Müller, 1776) and B. j. exsul (Todd, 1917). Another subspecies, B. j. apurensis, has been proposed as separate from exsul but that treatment has not been accepted. The orange-chinned and the grey-cheeked parakeet (B. pyrrhotera) are sister species.

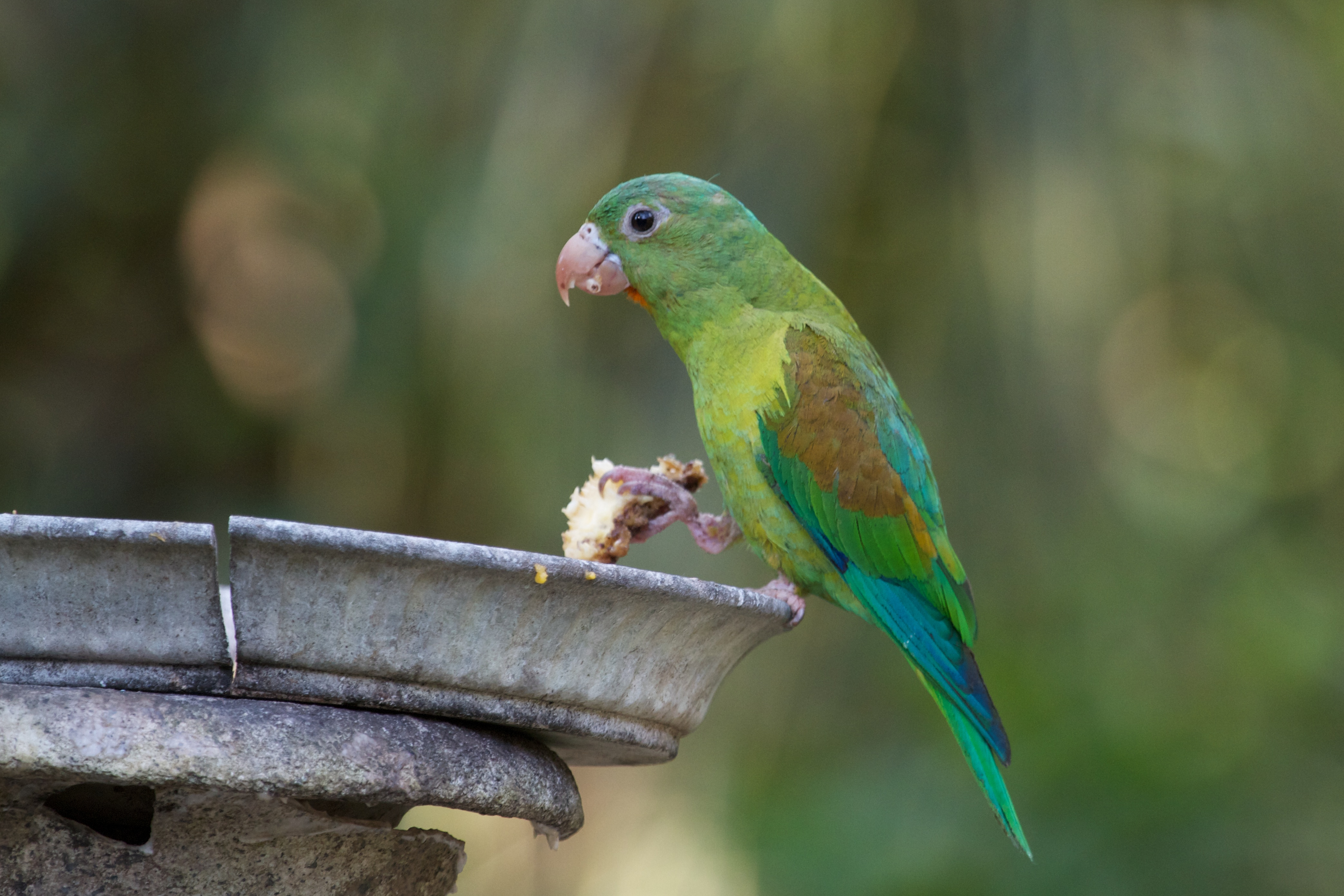
In Panama

== Description ==
The orange-chinned parakeet is 18 to 19 cm (7.1 to 7.5 in) long and weighs between 53 and 65 g (1.9 and 2.3 oz). Adults of the nominate subspecies have a bright green head with a bluish wash on the crown, a white eye ring, an orange chin, and a pale bill. The chin patch is often hard to see. Their upperparts and tail are bluish green with brown wing coverts that show as "shoulders" when perched. Their underparts are mostly bright green with bluish vent and thighs. Their underwing coverts are yellow. Immature birds are similar to adults. Subspecies B. j. exsul has entirely green underparts and a smaller and paler orange chin patch, darker "shoulders", and more olive in the mantle than the nominate.

== Distribution and habitat ==
The nominate subspecies of the orange-chinned parakeet has by far the larger range. It is found from the southwestern Mexican state of Oaxaca south mostly along the Pacific side of Central America through western, central, and northern Colombia into northwestern Venezuela. Subspecies B. j. exsul is found in northeastern Colombia's Arauca Department and northern and western Venezuela as far as Guárico. The species inhabits semi-open to open landscapes including Llanos, deciduous woodland, secondary and gallery forest, plantations, and treed parts of towns. It shuns evergreen forest. In elevation it ranges from sea level to 1,400 m (4,600 ft).

== Behavior ==
=== Movement ===
The orange-chinned parakeet is generally sedentary, but at least in El Salvador wanders locally after the breeding season. It is usually seen in pairs or small flocks.

=== Feeding ===
The orange-chinned parakeet often forages with the larger orange-fronted parakeet (Eupsittula canicularis). It feeds on a wide variety of foods, primarily fruits and seeds but also flowers, herbs, nectar, insects, and algae. It can damage cultivated fruit. Like many other parrots, it feeds on mineral-rich soil.

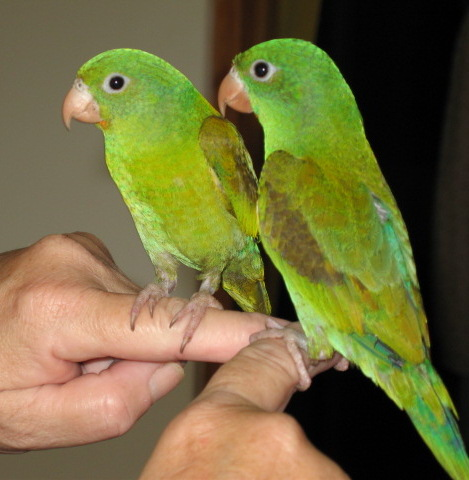
Two pet birds of this species

=== Breeding ===
The orange-chinned parakeet's breeding season spans from January to April. It nests in an old woodpecker hole, a natural cavity, or in a hole it excavates in an arboreal termite nest. Communal nesting in a large rotten snag has been observed. The typical clutch size is four to seven eggs. In captivity the incubation period is about 21 to 26 days and fledging occurs about two to three weeks after hatch.

=== Vocalization ===
The orange-chinned parakeet's common calls are "a high-pitched "klee", shrill "chree" or bisyllabic "chree-chree"" that are given when perched or in flight. It also makes "a fast chattering series "cra-cra-cra-cra-cra"." It makes "a near constant, shrill, harsh chatter."

== Status ==
The IUCN has assessed the orange-chinned parakeet as being of Least Concern. It has a very large range and an estimated population of at least a half million mature individuals. The latter, however, is believed to be decreasing. No immediate threats have been identified. It is considered "[c]ommon to abundant throughout most of range, but uncommon in Oaxaca, Mexico."
