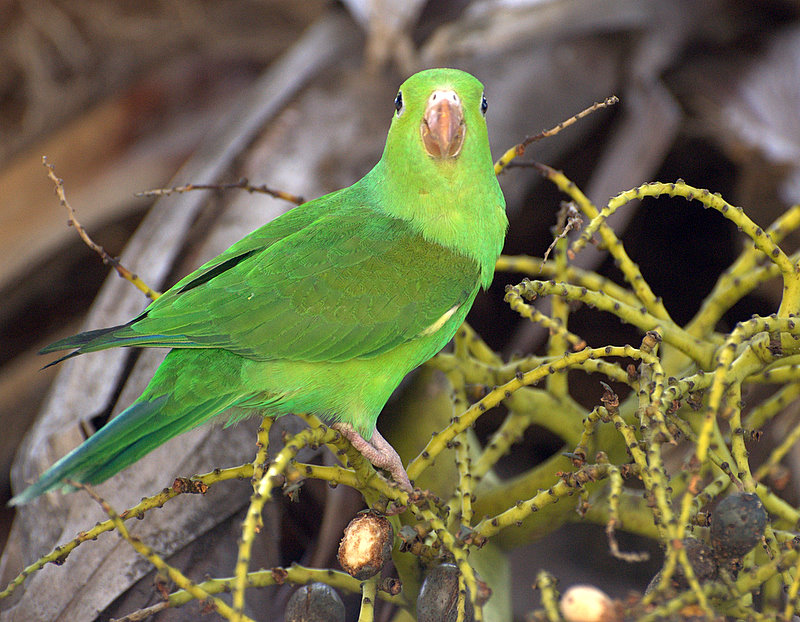
- Plain parakeet

Scientific classification
- Kingdom: Animalia
- Phylum: Chordata
- Class: Aves
- Order: Psittaciformes
- Family: Psittacidae
- Subfamily: Arinae
- Genus: Brotogeris; Vigors, 1825

Type species
- Psittacus pyrrhopterus (grey-cheeked parakeet) Latham, 1801

Species
- see text

= Brotogeris =

Genus of birds

Brotogeris is a genus of small parrots endemic to Central and South America. Their closest relatives are the monk parakeet and the cliff parakeet in the genus Myiopsitta. They eat seeds and fruit. The word brotogeris means "having the voice of a human". In the language of their native countries, which is mostly Spanish, they are called pericos – the translation of which is "parakeet". Their average lifespan is 15 years, although some have been reported to have lived up to 35 years. Also, the bird was found in Rio Grande do Sul in South America.

== Taxonomy ==
The genus Brotogeris was introduced in 1825 by Irish zoologist Nicholas Aylward Vigors with Psittacus pyrrhopterus Latham, the grey-cheeked parakeet, as the type species. The genus name is from the Ancient Greek brotogērus meaning "with human voice".

The genus contains eight species:

Image	Common name	Scientific name	Distribution
	Tui parakeet	Brotogeris sanctithomae	Brazil, and Amazonian Peru, Bolivia, eastern Ecuador, and south-eastern Colombia.
	Plain parakeet	Brotogeris tirica	Brazil.
	White-winged parakeet	Brotogeris versicolurus	southeast Colombia to the river's mouth in Brazil.
	Yellow-chevroned parakeet, canary-winged parakeet	Brotogeris chiriri	central Brazil to southern Bolivia, Paraguay, and northern Argentina.
	Grey-cheeked parakeet	Brotogeris pyrrhoptera	northwestern Peru and western Ecuador
	Orange-chinned parakeet, Tovi parakeet	Brotogeris jugularis	from Mexico, through Central America, to Venezuela.
	Cobalt-winged parakeet	Brotogeris cyanoptera	Venezuela, Colombia, Ecuador, Peru, and Bolivia; and Brazil
	Golden-winged parakeet	Brotogeris chrysoptera	Brazil, French Guiana, Guyana, Suriname, (the Guianas), and Venezuela

=== Phylogeny ===
The species form a monophyletic group whose closest relatives are the monk parakeet and the cliff parakeet in the genus Myiopsitta. Within Brotogeris the species are divided into two separate clades.

- - Myiopsitta
    Monk parakeet, Myiopsitta monachus
  - Brotogeris
    - - Plain parakeet, Brotogeris tirica
      - - - White-winged parakeet, Brotogeris versicolurus
          - Yellow-chevroned parakeet, Brotogeris chiriri
        - Tui parakeet, Brotogeris sanctithomae
    - - - Grey-cheeked parakeet, Brotogeris pyrrhoptera
        - Orange-chinned parakeet, Brotogeris jugularis
      - - Cobalt-winged parakeet, Brotogeris cyanoptera
        - Golden-winged parakeet, Brotogeris chrysoptera

== Gallery ==
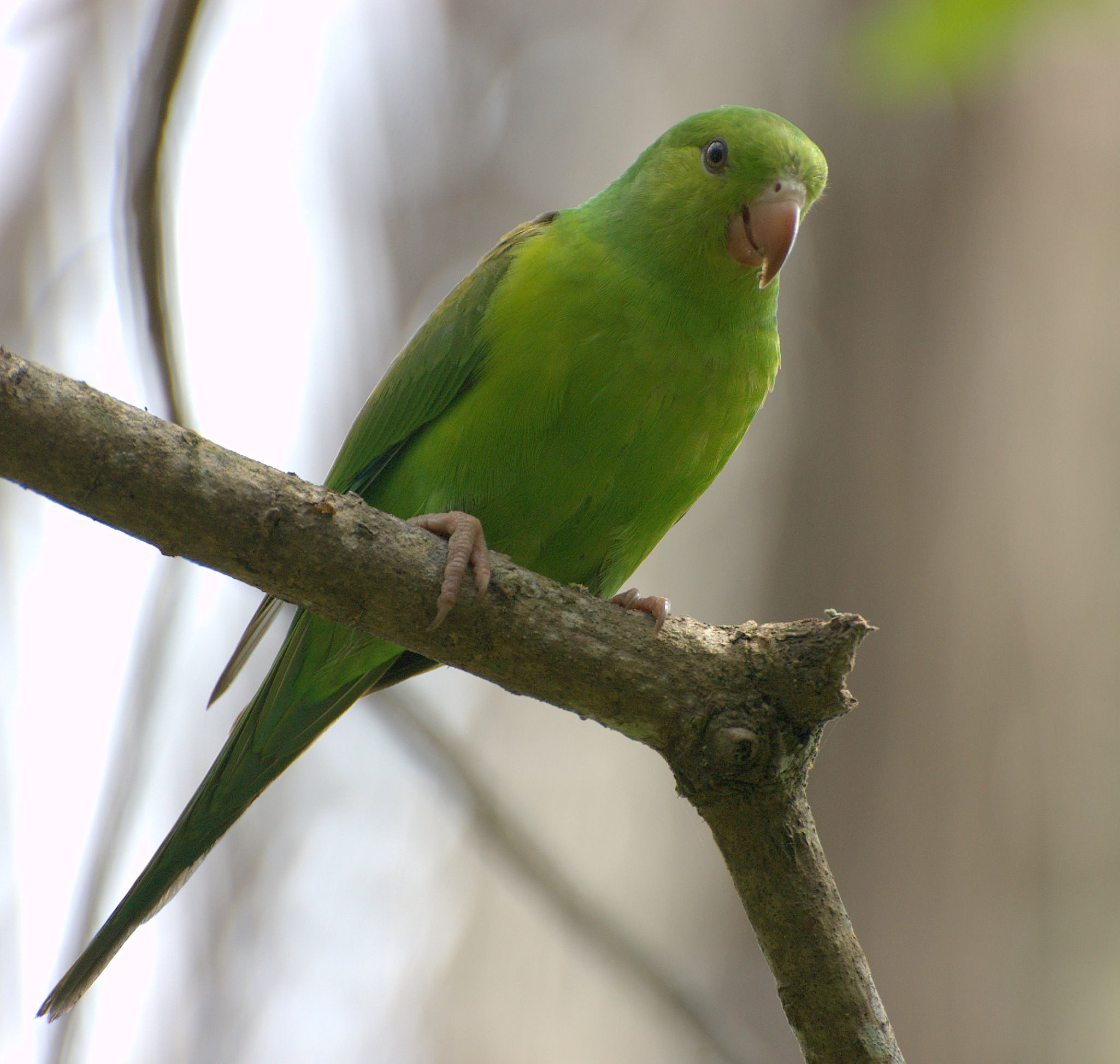
Plain parakeet
(B. tirica)

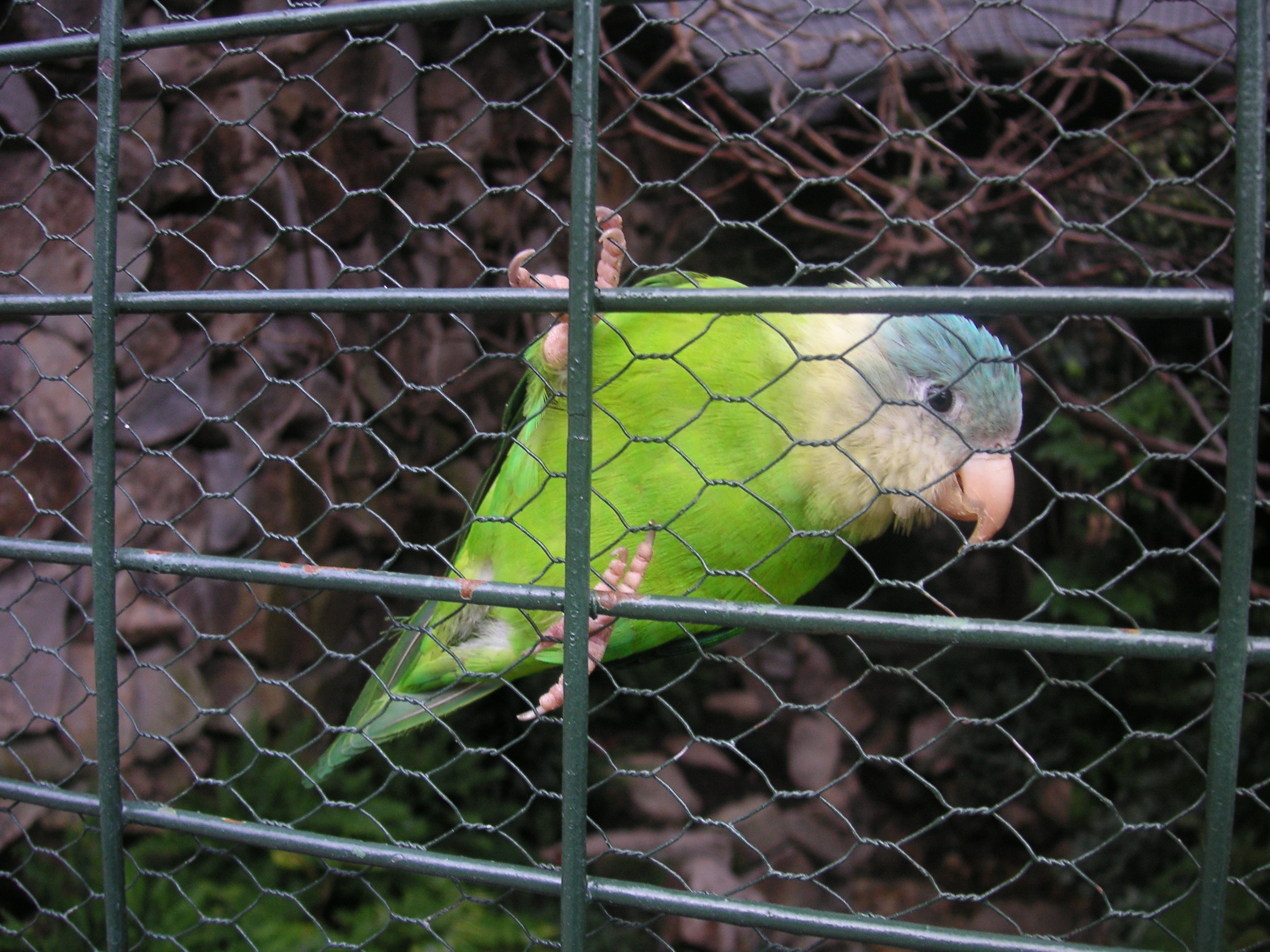
Grey-cheeked parakeet
(B. pyrrhoptera)

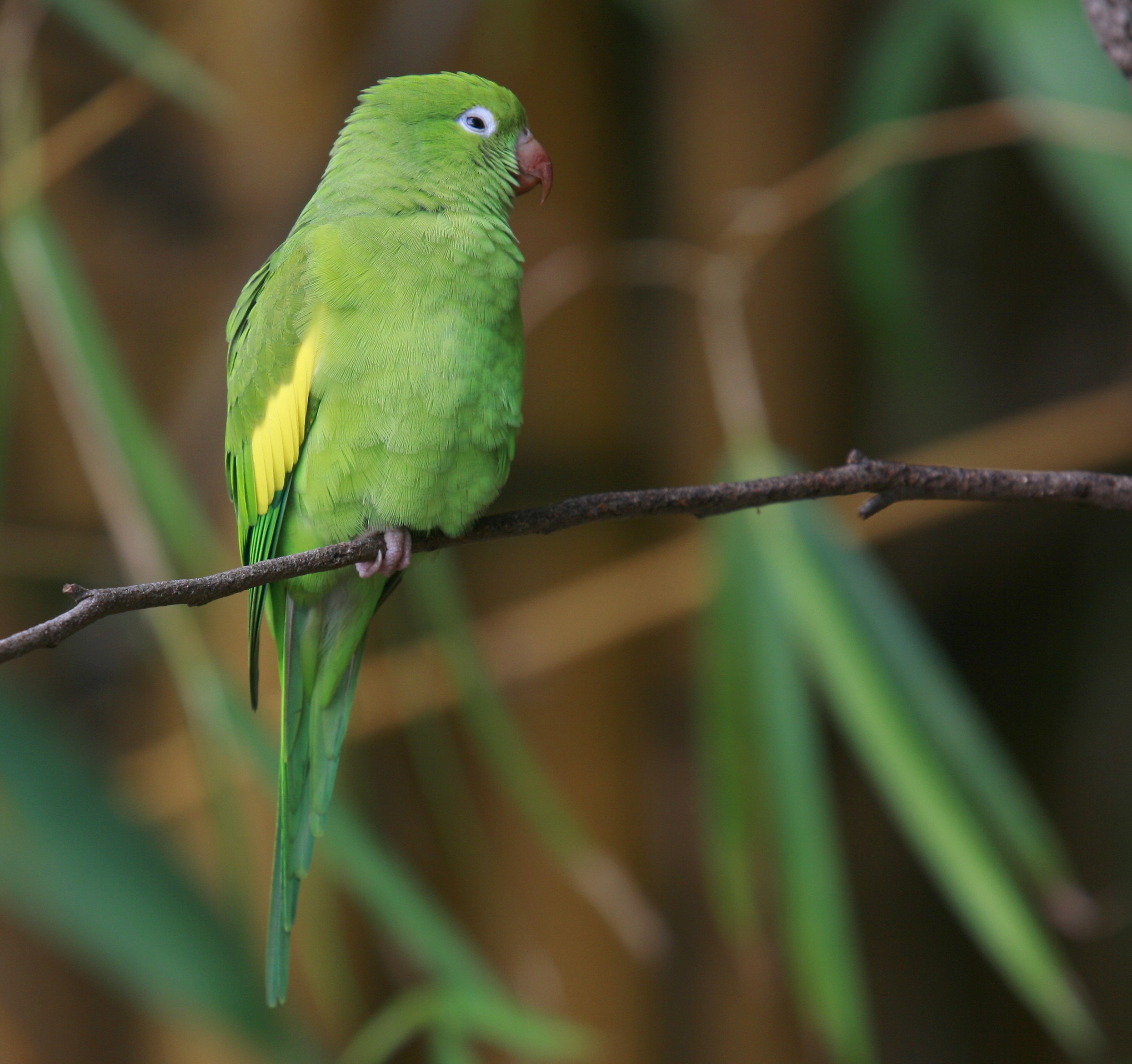
Yellow-chevroned parakeet
(B. chiriri)

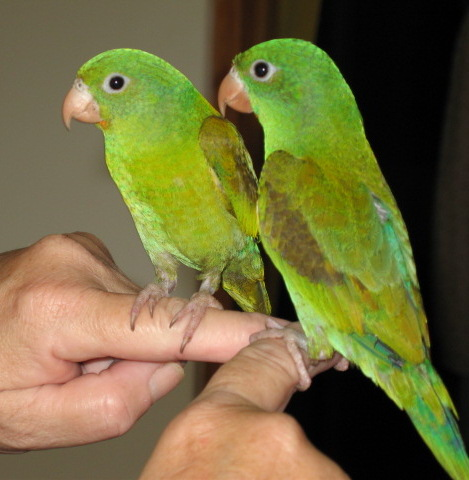
Orange-chinned parakeet
(B. jugularis)

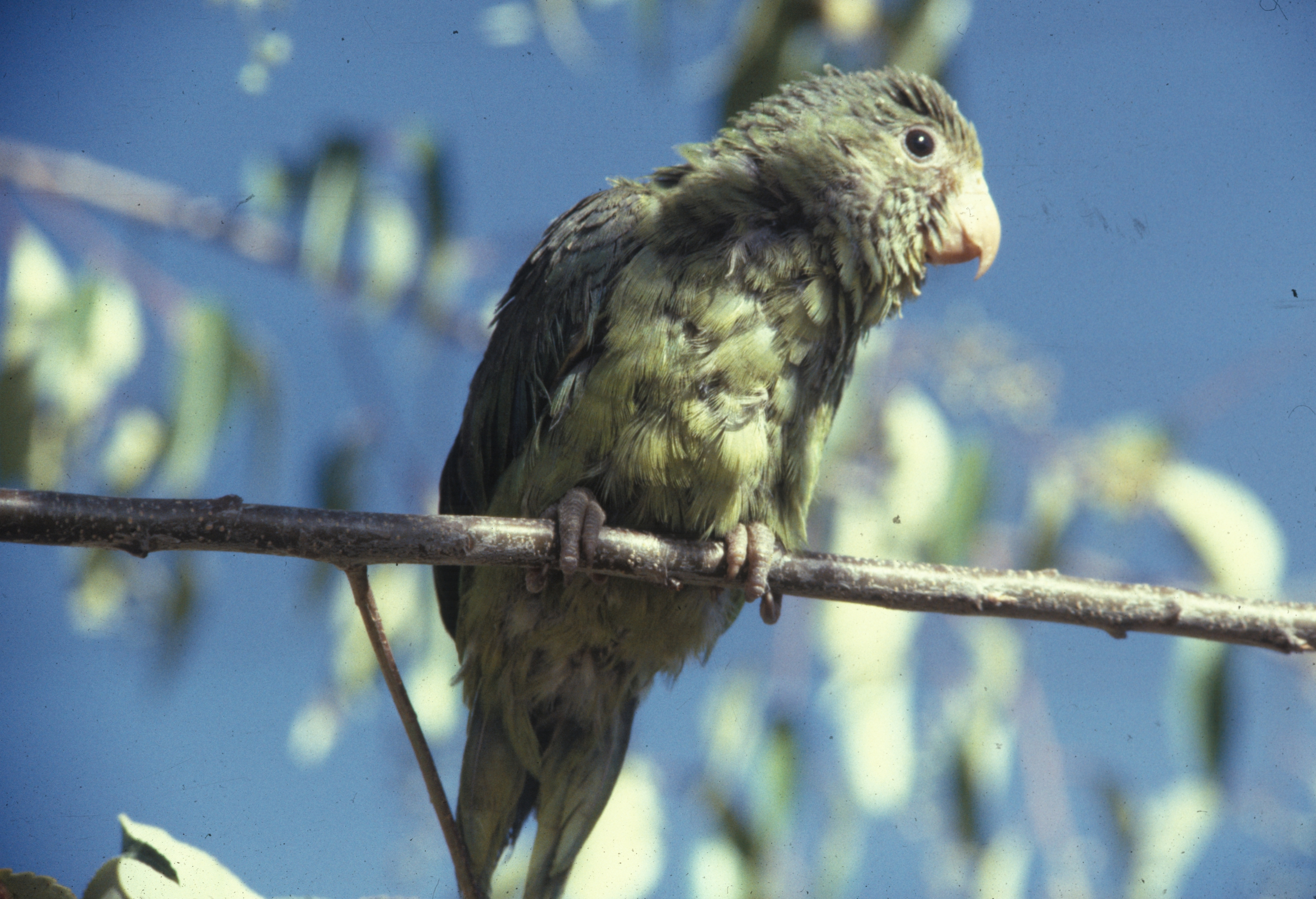
Cobalt-winged parakeet
(B. cyanoptera)

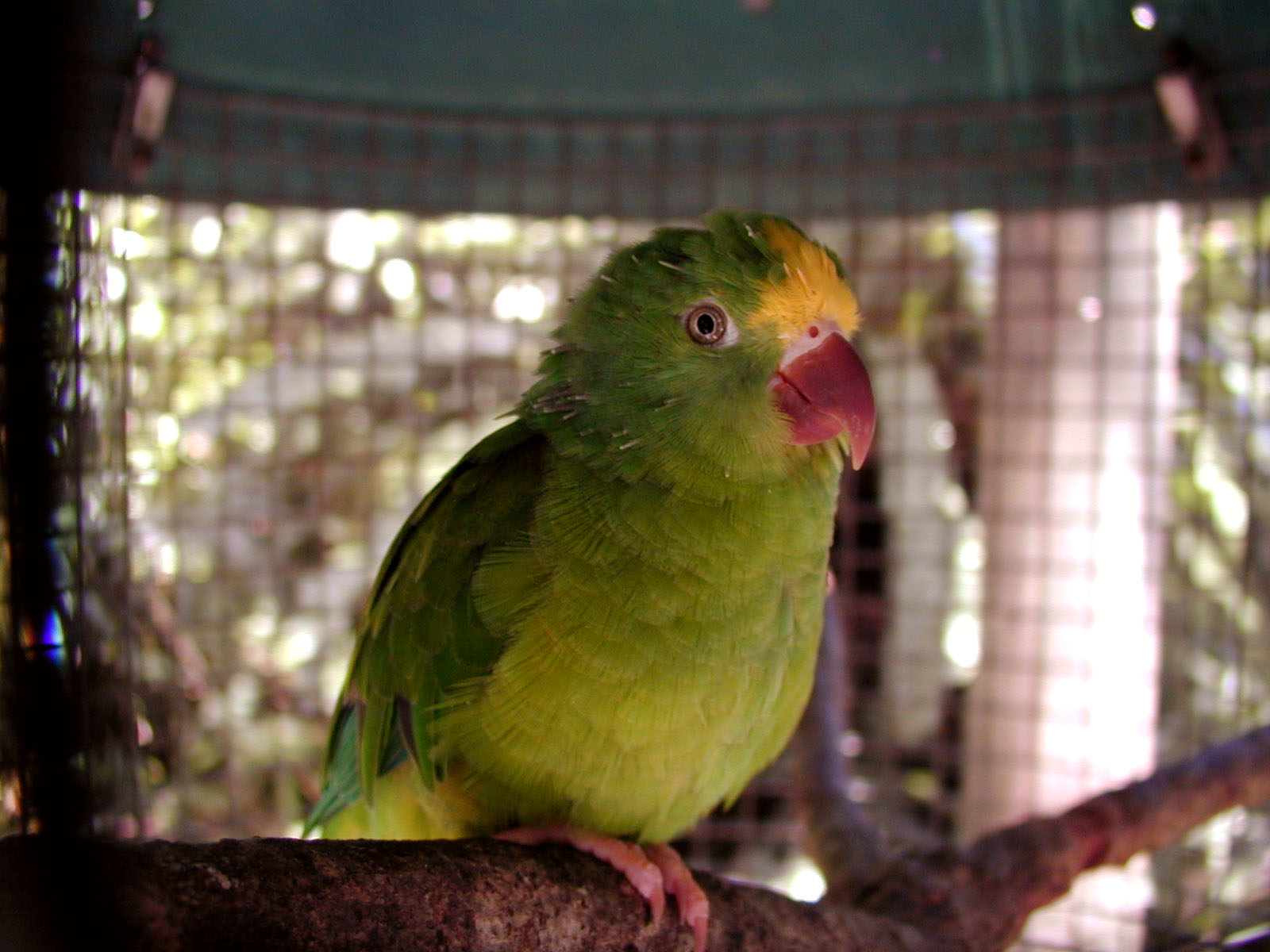
Tui parakeet
(B. sanctithomae)
