= Speckle-faced parrot =

The speckle-faced parrot has been split into the following species:

- Plum-crowned parrot, Pionus tumultuosus
- White-capped parrot, Pionus seniloides
