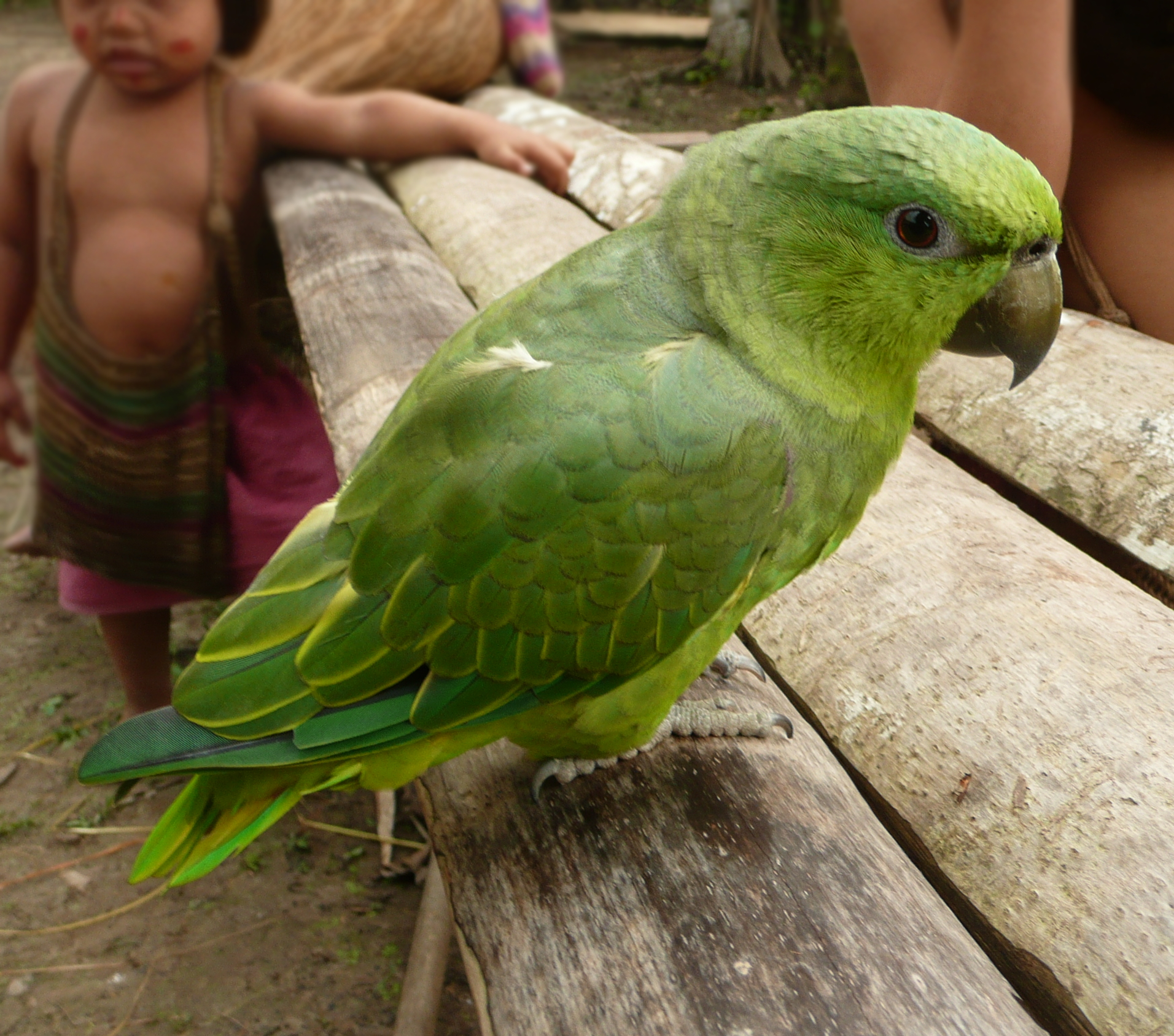
- At a Peruvian village

Conservation status
- Least Concern (IUCN 3.1)
- CITES Appendix II

Scientific classification
- Kingdom: Animalia
- Phylum: Chordata
- Class: Aves
- Order: Psittaciformes
- Family: Psittacidae
- Tribe: Androglossini
- Genus: Graydidascalus; Bonaparte, 1854
- Species: G. brachyurus

Binomial name
- Graydidascalus brachyurus (Temminck & Kuhl, 1820)

= Short-tailed parrot =

Species of bird

The short-tailed parrot (Graydidascalus brachyurus) is a species of bird in subfamily Arinae of the family Psittacidae, the African and New World parrots. It is found in Brazil, Colombia, Ecuador, French Guiana, and Peru.

== Taxonomy and systematics ==
The short-tailed parrot is the only member of its genus and has no subspecies. Its closest relatives are the yellow-faced parrot (Alipiopsitta xanthops) and the members of the genus Pionus.

== Description ==
The short-tailed parrot is 24 to 25 cm (9.4 to 9.8 in) long and weighs 188 to 233 g (6.6 to 8.2 oz). It has a large head and, as suggested by its name, a very short tail. Adults are almost entirely green that is yellowish on their underparts and their uppertail coverts. Their lores are dark which continues behind the eye. Their primaries are a darker green and their wing coverts have yellow edges. Their shoulder is a reddish brown that is seldom visible except in flight. Their outer tail feathers have red bands at their base. Their bill ranges from light green to dark gray and their iris is orange-red. Immature birds are the same as adults except they have no red on their tail.

== Distribution and habitat ==
The short-tailed parrot is found along the Amazon River and its tributaries from southern Colombia, northeastern Ecuador, and northeastern Peru to the Atlantic. Its range also extends north along the coast of Brazil into northeastern French Guiana. Along the rivers it inhabits várzea, swampy floodplains, and islands; on the coast it inhabits mangroves. It also locally ranges into cultivated areas. In elevation it ranges from sea level to about 400 m (1,310 ft).

== Behavior ==
=== Movement ===
The short-tailed parrot is thought to make some movements, perhaps in response to the timing of seasonal flooding.

=== Feeding ===
The short-tailed parrot feeds on fruits, especially those of figs (Ficus), and on those of cultivated guava (Psidium guajava) and mango (Mangifera indica). It also feeds on seeds, nuts, berries, and the catkins of Cecropia.

=== Breeding ===
The short-tailed parrot's breeding season appears to include September but nothing else is known about its breeding biology.

=== Vocalization ===
The short-tailed parrot is rather noisy. Its flight call is "a rather high-pitched rolling "kree-ki-ki"." It makes a variety of loud, harsh, "conversational" calls when perched.

== Status ==
The IUCN has assessed the short-tailed parrot as being of Least Concern. It has a very large range but its population size is not known and is believed to be decreasing. No immediate threats have been identified. It is considered common to locally abundant, but is scarcer in the upper reaches of the Amazon system.
