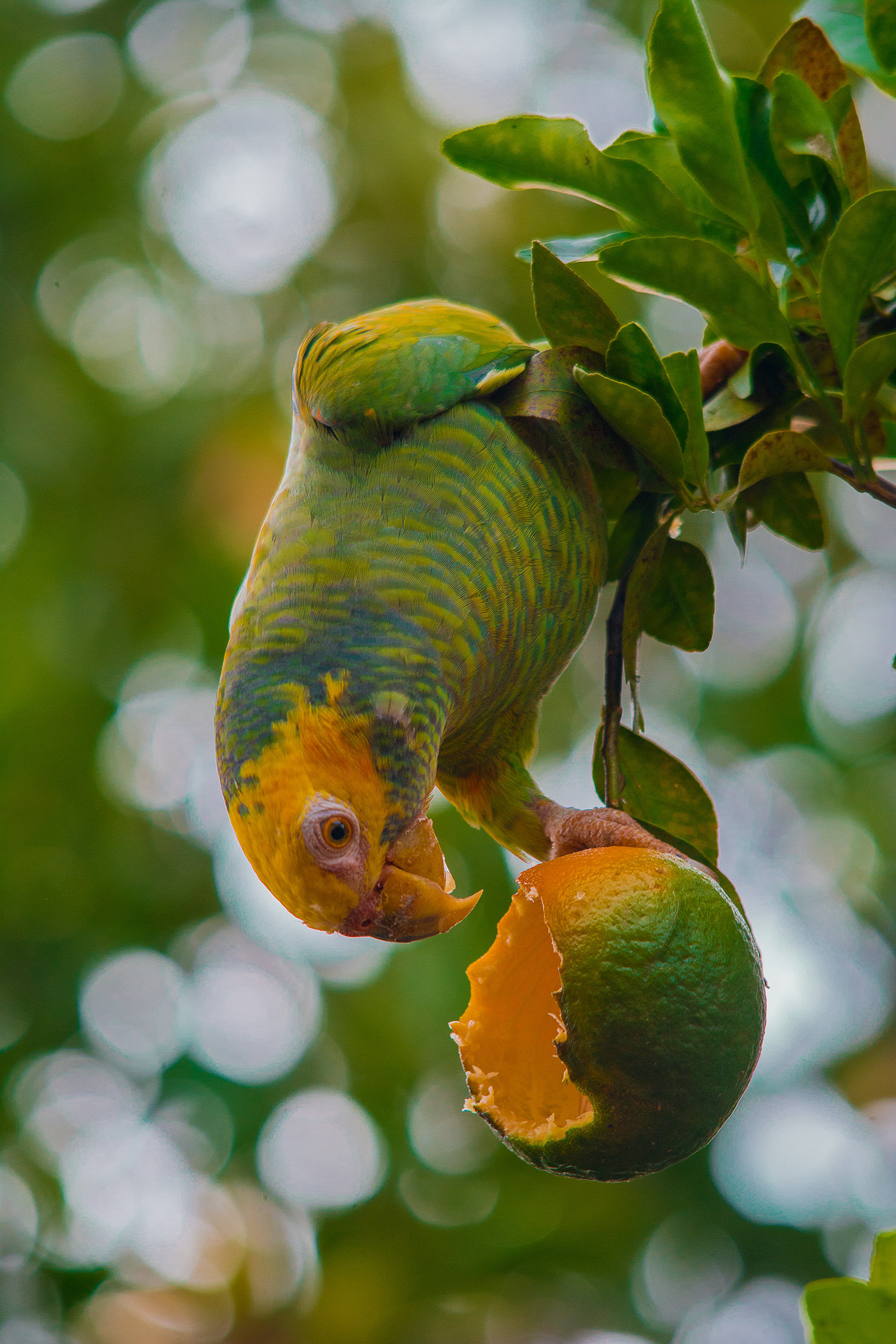
- Adult

Conservation status
- Near Threatened (IUCN 3.1)

Scientific classification
- Kingdom: Animalia
- Phylum: Chordata
- Class: Aves
- Order: Psittaciformes
- Family: Psittacidae
- Genus: Alipiopsitta; Caparroz & Pacheco, 2006
- Species: A. xanthops

Binomial name
- Alipiopsitta xanthops (Spix, 1824)

Synonyms
- Amazona xanthops Salvatoria xanthops

= Yellow-faced parrot =

Species of bird

The yellow-fronted parrot (Poicephalus flavifrons) from Africa is occasionally called "yellow-faced parrot".

The yellow-faced parrot (Alipiopsitta xanthops), formerly also known as the yellow-faced amazon, is the only species of the genus Alipiopsitta. It is a Neotropical parrot (tribe Arini), and was classified in the genus Amazona for many years. It is a predominantly green and yellow-plumaged bird with a yellow head. It is a semi-nomadic species found in the cerrado region of Brazil and adjacent Bolivia. As the yellow-faced parrot has disappeared from parts of its former range due to habitat destruction and generally occurs in low densities, it was considered vulnerable by the IUCN, but it remains locally fairly common, occurs in several protected areas and can survive in fragmented habitats, leading to its downlisting to near-threatened.

== Taxonomy ==
The German naturalist Johann Baptist von Spix first described the species in 1824 as Psittacus xanthops. Its species name is derived from the Ancient Greek xanthos "yellow", and ops "face". For many years, it was placed within the genus Amazona, although Alípio de Miranda Ribeiro proposed the new genus Salvatoria in 1920 due to differences in the bill and plumage. A 1995 study showed its distinctness genetically, followed up by more data which showed it to be much more closely related to the short-tailed parrot (Graydidascalus brachyurus) and to the members of the genus Pionus. Following this discovery, it was briefly placed in the genus Salvatoria again, until this name was found to be pre-occupied by a group of polychaete worms from the superfamily Nereidoidea, thus leading to the transferral of the yellow-faced parrot to the new genus Alipiopsitta.

== Description ==
Measuring about 27 cm (11 in) in length, the yellow-faced parrot has a stocky body and short tail. It is a predominantly green and yellow-plumaged bird that in adults has a yellow crown, lores, cheeks and auriculars. The rest of the head, upperparts and chest are green with some yellowish-green scalloping. The sides of the belly are often mottled orange and yellow, and the belly is often yellow. However, there are significant variations in the amount of yellow to the underparts, and some show virtually none. The wings are predominantly green, occasionally with some yellow spots. There is blue edging on the primary coverts. The central feathers of the short tail are green, while the lateral ones are more yellow-green and have orange-red bases. The bill is yellowish-horn with a dark culmen, the cere is pinkish, and the iris is yellow. The legs are light grey. There is no sexual dimorphism; the male and female are alike in plumage and size. Immatures have less yellow to the head.

== Distribution and habitat ==
The majority of its range is in central and eastern Brazil, where found from Maranhão and Piauí to São Paulo and Mato Grosso do Sul. It inhabits the cerrado on the plateau of Brazil, as well as the dryer Caatinga scrubland. There are two records from Beni in northeastern Bolivia. Despite occasionally being listed for Paraguay, evidence supporting its presence in this country is lacking. Within its range it appears to be semi-nomadic. Much of its habitat is being converted to agricultural land and the populations are declining.

== Behaviour ==
The yellow-faced parrot forages for and eats the fruit and seeds of trees including Anacardium species, Salacia crassifolia and Astronium fraxinifolium. Flocks have also been recorded raiding crops of mango and unripe guava trees. Termites are another diet item.

Until recently, comparatively little was known of its habits. It has been studied in Emas National Park in Brazil. Its breeding season there is May to October. Nests are hollows in termite mounds. The eggs are incubated for 19–22 days, while the young take up to 45 days to leave the nest.

Like most species of parrots, the yellow-faced parrot is protected by the Convention on International Trade in Endangered Species of Wild Fauna and Flora (CITES) with its placement on the Appendix II list.
