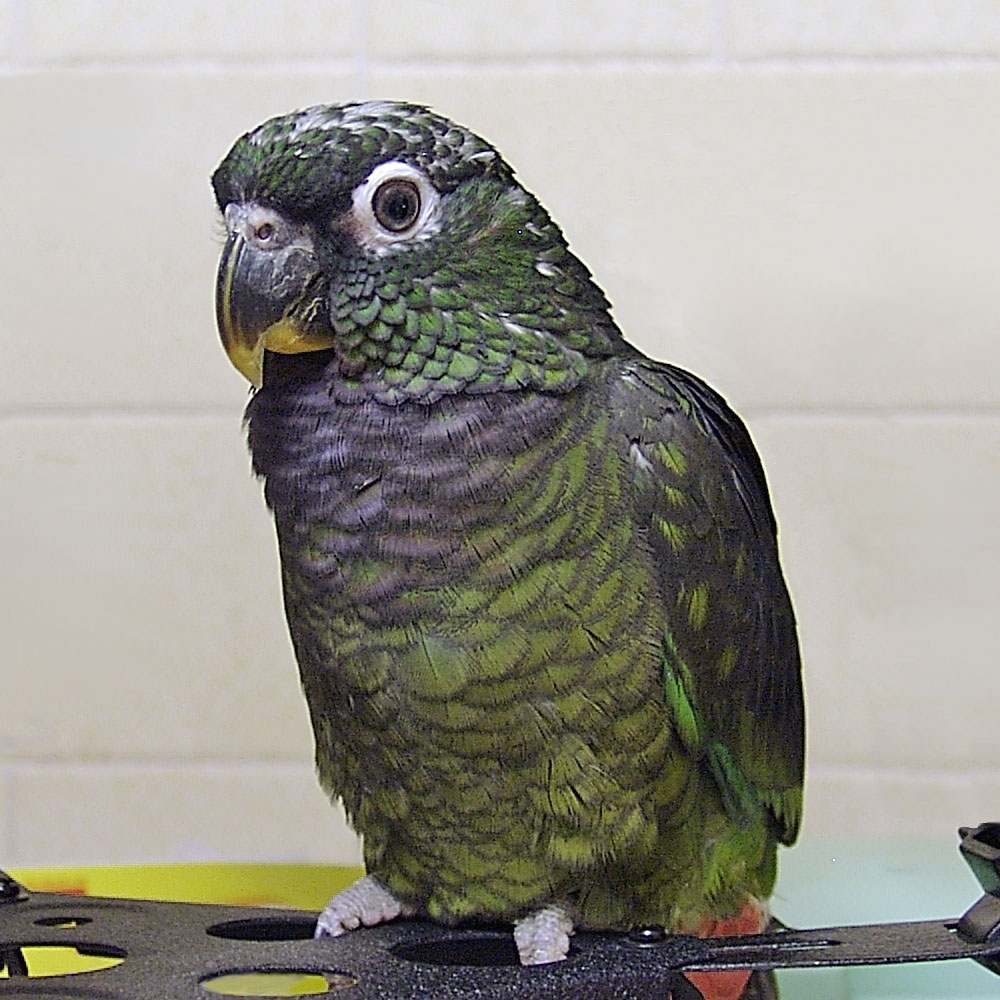

Conservation status
- Least Concern (IUCN 3.1)
- CITES Appendix II

Scientific classification
- Kingdom: Animalia
- Phylum: Chordata
- Class: Aves
- Order: Psittaciformes
- Family: Psittacidae
- Subfamily: Arinae
- Tribe: Androglossini
- Genus: Pionus
- Species: P. maximiliani

Binomial name
- Pionus maximiliani (Kuhl, 1820)

= Scaly-headed parrot =

Species of bird

The scaly-headed parrot (Pionus maximiliani) is a species of bird in subfamily Arinae of the family Psittacidae, the African and New World parrots. It is also called scaly-headed pionus, Maximilian pionus, Maximilian parrot, Maximilian's pionus, or Maximilian's parrot. It is found in Brazil, Bolivia, Argentina, and Paraguay.

== Taxonomy and systematics ==
The scaly-headed parrot has these four subspecies:

- P. m. maximiliani (Kuhl, 1820)
- P. m. siy Souancé, 1856
- P. m. lacerus Heine, 1884
- P. m. melanoblepharus Miranda-Ribeiro, 1920

The scaly-headed parrot and the red-billed parrot (P. sordidus) are sister species. The species' specific epithet is a reference to Prince Maximilian of Wied-Neuwied, a nobleman and naturalist who explored the hinterlands of southeastern Brazil in the early 19th century.

In Brazil, the scaly-headed parrot is called cocotas or maritacas (from mbaé'taka, tupi for "noisy bird").

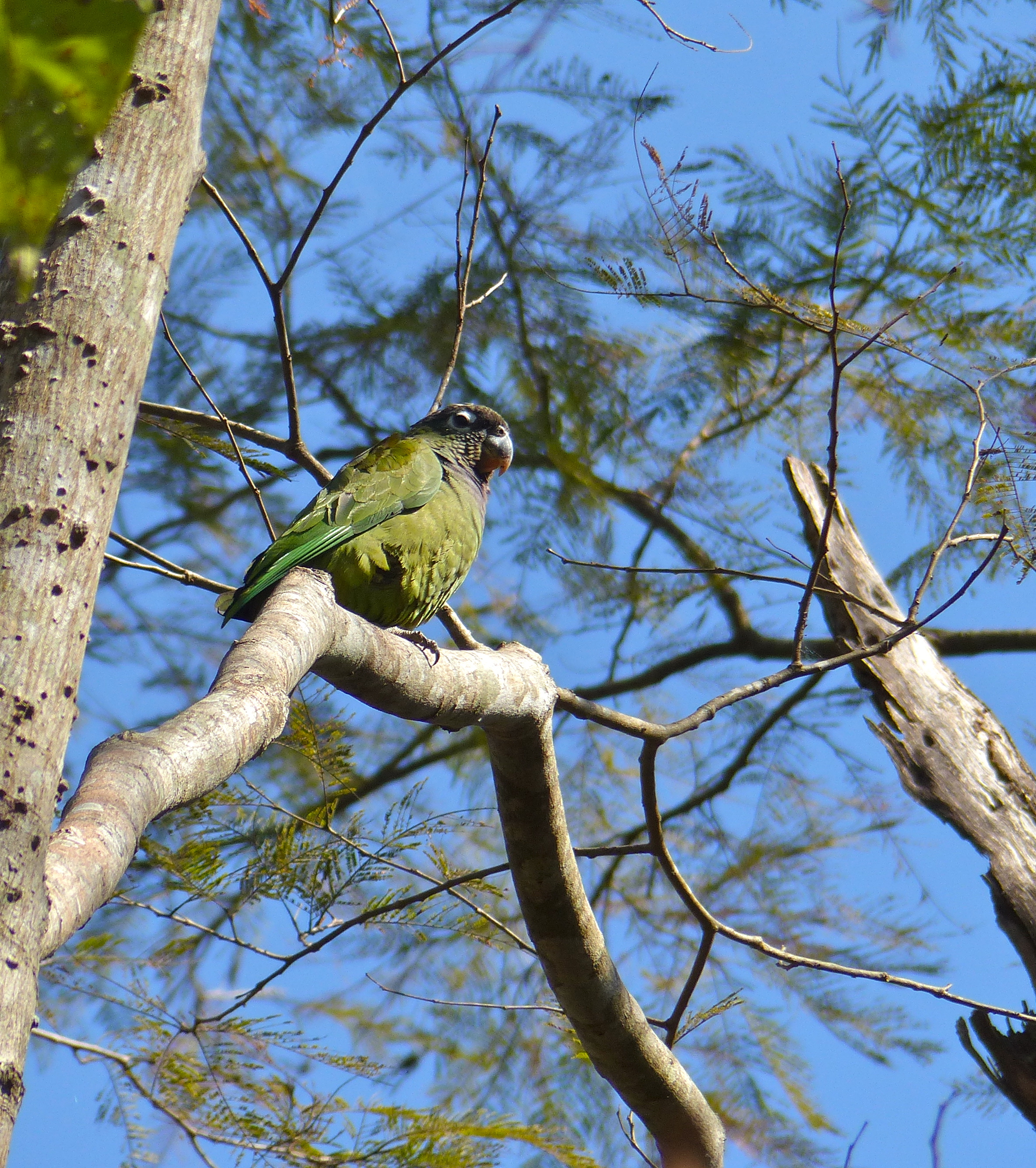
Wild scaly-headed parrot

== Description ==
The scaly-headed parrot is 25 to 29 cm (9.8 to 11 in) long and weighs 233 to 293 g (8.2 to 10 oz). Adults of the nominate subspecies P. m. maximiliani have a blackish brown forehead and mid-crown. Their rest of their head, their nape, and their upper back are dark greenish bronze; the feathers have darker edges that give the eponymous scaly effect. Their eye has arcs of bare white skin above and below. Their lower back and wings are dull green with lighter scaling. Their throat and upper breast are dull blue that becomes yellowish green on the belly. Their undertail coverts and base of the tail are red. The inner tail feathers are green and the outer ones blue. Immature birds have a paler green head and less blue on the breast than adults.

Subspecies P. m. melanoblepharus is larger than the nominate; its green areas and the blue breast are darker and the skin around the eye is dark. P. m. siy is also darker than the nominate, with a reddish purple chin and throat. P. m. lacerus is like siy but larger and has more, and more intense, blue on the breast.

== Distribution and habitat ==
The subspecies of the scaly-headed parrot are found thus:

- P. m. maximiliani, northeastern and east-central Brazil from Ceará and Piauí south to Goiás and Bahia
- P. m. siy, central and southeastern Bolivia, western and central Paraguay, and west-central Brazil into northern Argentina
- P. m. lacerus, northwestern Argentina's Salta, Tucumán and Catamarca provinces
- P. m. melanoblepharus, southeastern Brazil from Minas Gerais south through eastern Paraguay into northeastern Argentina's Misiones and Corrientes provinces

The scaly-headed parrot inhabits a variety of landscapes that vary geographically. In the north and west of its range it favors deciduous and gallery forest in the somewhat dry caatinga and Chaco. In the southeast it is found in more humid evergreen and semi-deciduous forests including those dominated by Araucaria. It Brazil it reaches elevations of 1,500 to 1,600 m (4,900 to 5,200 ft) and in Argentinal up to 2,000 m (6,600 ft).

Feral scaly-headed parrots have been observed breeding since 2017 in the parks of Málaga, Spain. In one Spanish case a female scaly-headed parrot was observed successfully raising hybrid offspring with a male orange-winged amazon (Amazona amazonica).

== Behavior ==
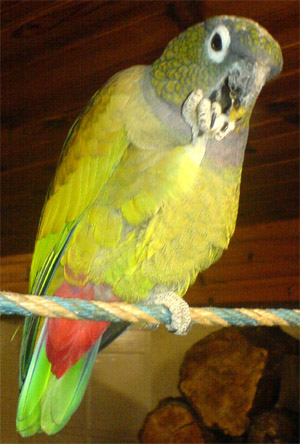
A captive scaly-headed parrot

=== Movement ===
The scaly-headed parrot is a year-round resident throughout its range.

=== Feeding ===
The scaly-headed parrot feeds on the seeds, flowers, and fruit of a wide variety of plants.

=== Breeding ===
The scaly-headed parrot's breeding season appears to vary geographically but has not been fully defined. It nests in holes in trees. In captivity the clutch size is four or five eggs and the time from hatching to fledging is nine weeks.

=== Vocalization ===
One author says that the scaly-headed parrot's call is a "cacaphony of very high, shrill 'teer-teer-teer--'." Another says its primary flight call is "a repeated bisyllabic "cra-cheh", sometimes simply 'crreeh' or 'cheh' and that it also has a variety of 'conversational' calls, some with a more nasal quality" given while perched.

== Status ==
The IUCN has assessed the scaly-headed parrot as being of Least Concern. It has a very large range but its population size is not known and is believed to be decreasing. The primary threat appears to be the pet trade, especially in Argentina, and which though illegal continues albeit at a lower pace than in the 20th century. It is considered common in southern Brazil and "patchily common" in Paraguay and Argentina.
