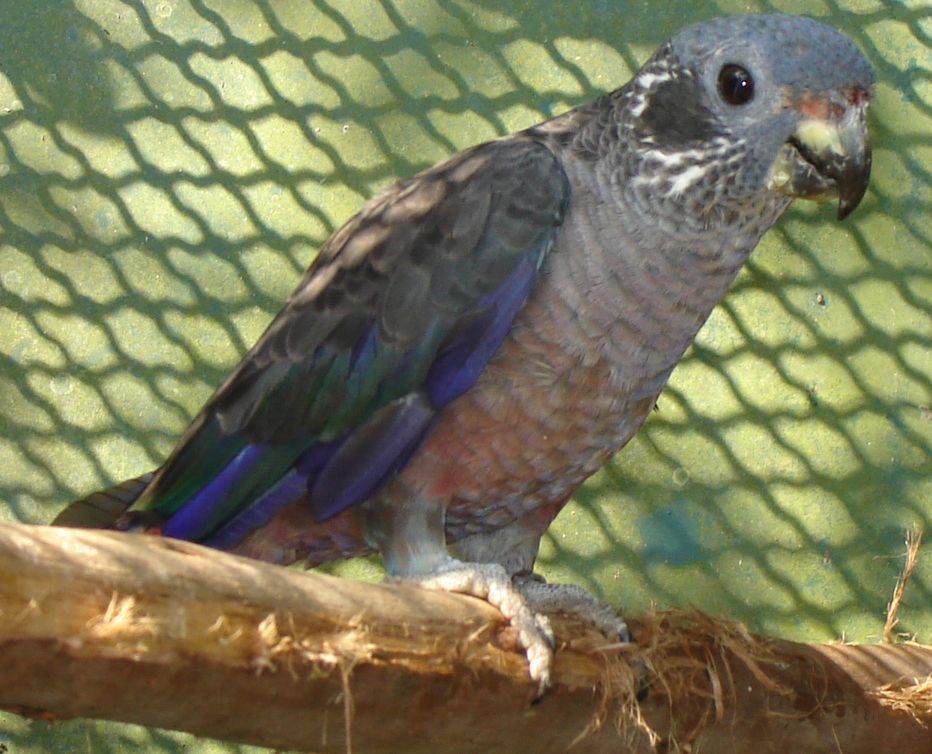

Conservation status
- Least Concern (IUCN 3.1)

Scientific classification
- Kingdom: Animalia
- Phylum: Chordata
- Class: Aves
- Order: Psittaciformes
- Family: Psittacidae
- Genus: Pionus
- Species: P. fuscus

Binomial name
- Pionus fuscus (Müller, 1776)

= Dusky parrot =

Species of bird

The dusky parrot (Pionus fuscus) or dusky pionus is a medium-sized mainly dark brownish-gray parrot of the genus Pionus in the true parrot family.

== Description ==
The dusky parrot is approximately 24 cm (9.4 in) long. It has a medium-wide gray eye-ring (often fades to white in captivity), a splay of cream-white feathers on its upper neck, a pinkish-red tinge to the belly, and red undertail coverts. The remiges and tail are blue, with the latter red at the base. Overall, the dusky parrot is a dark brownish-gray (tending towards black in poor light) bird.

== Breeding ==
The dusky parrot nests in tree cavities. The eggs are white and there are usually three or four in a clutch. The female incubates the eggs for about 26 days and the chicks leave the nest about 70 days after hatching.

== Distribution and habitat ==
The dusky parrot's natural habitat is humid lowland forest. Its range is northern South America, and is centered on the Guiana countries, the Guiana Shield, and the northeastern Amazon Basin. It is mostly limited on the west in central-eastern Venezuela by avoiding the Orinoco River itself, but living on its eastern side, from near the Caribbean coast to about 1000 km upstream. To the west a small disjunct group lives west of Lake Maracaibo on the Colombia-Venezuela border.

Other limits to dusky parrot's range is northwest Maranhão state Brazil, Baia de Sao Marcos; also in the southeast Amazon Basin, the confluence of the northern flowing Araguaia-Tocantins River. South of Guyana in the western Guianas, the range limit of the dusky parrot is in central Roraima state Brazil; the bird is found east of the south-flowing Branco River in its lower reaches; the upper reaches are in the contiguous range going into Guyana and Venezuela.

== Aviculture ==
They are not known for talking like other parrots; instead they can say from 10-20 words.
