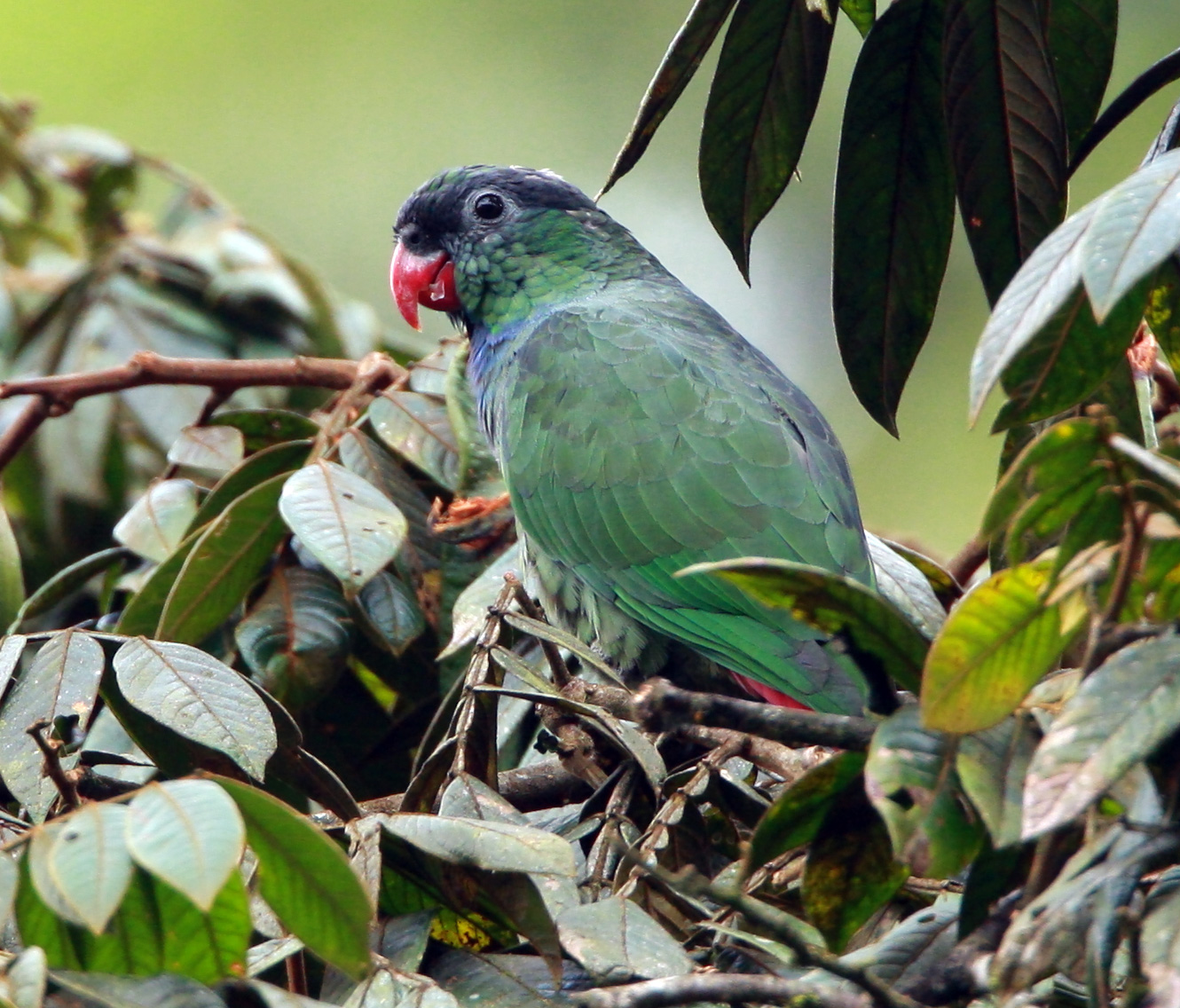

Conservation status
- Least Concern (IUCN 3.1)
- CITES Appendix II

Scientific classification
- Kingdom: Animalia
- Phylum: Chordata
- Class: Aves
- Order: Psittaciformes
- Family: Psittacidae
- Genus: Pionus
- Species: P. sordidus

Binomial name
- Pionus sordidus (Linnaeus, 1758)

Synonyms
- Psittacus sordidus Linnaeus, 1758

= Red-billed parrot =

Species of bird

The red-billed parrot (Pionus sordidus), also known as coral-billed pionus or red-billed pionus, is a species of bird in subfamily Arinae of the family Psittacidae, the African and New World parrots. It is found in Bolivia, Colombia, Ecuador, Peru, and Venezuela.

== Taxonomy and systematics ==
In 1751 the English naturalist George Edwards included an illustration and a description of the red-billed parrot in the fourth volume of his A Natural History of Uncommon Birds. He used the English name "The dusky parrot". Edwards based his hand-colored etching on a live bird in London that was owned by the botanist and Fellow of the Royal Society Peter Collinson. Collinson believed his parrot had come from New Spain. When in 1758 the Swedish naturalist Carl Linnaeus updated his Systema Naturae for the tenth edition, he placed the red-billed parrot with the other parrots in the genus Psittacus. Linnaeus included a brief description, coined the binomial name Psittacus sordidus, and cited Edwards' work. The red-billed parrot is now one of eight species of parrot placed in the genus Pionus that was introduced in 1832 by the German naturalist Johann Georg Wagler. The genus name is from Ancient Greek piōn, pionos meaning "fat". The specific epithet sordidus is Latin meaning "shabby" or "dirty".

The red-billed parrot has these six subspecies:

- P. s. saturatus Todd, 1915
- P. s. ponsi Aveledo & Ginés, 1950
- P. s. sordidus (Linnaeus, 1758)
- P. s. antelius Todd, 1947
- P. s. corallinus Bonaparte, 1854
- P. s. mindoensis Chapman, 1925

In the early 20th century some authors treated subspecies P. s. corallinus as a separate species. More recently some authors have questioned the validity of P. s. mindoensis as separate from corallinus. The red-billed parrot and the scaly-headed parrot (P. maximiliani) are sister species.

== Description ==
The red-billed parrot is 27 to 29 cm (11 to 11 in) long and weighs about 272 g (9.6 oz). All of the subspecies have the eponymous red bill. Adults of the nominate subspecies P. s. sordidus have a dull green head whose feathers have dull blue edges; their eye is surrounded by bare grayish skin. Their back, wings, and inner tail feathers are olive green; their outer tail feathers are blue. Their upper breast is dull blue that becomes buff-olive with a pink tinge on the belly. Their undertail coverts are red. Immature birds have a green head and breast and yellowish green undertail coverts.

Subspecies P. s. antelius is paler than the nominate and has very little blue on the breast. P. s. saturatus is darker than the nominate and P. s. ponsi is darker than saturatus. Subspecies P. s. corallinus is larger and greener than the nominate, and its mantle and back have gray and blue tinges. P. s. mindoensis is similar to corallinus but somewhat yellower.

== Distribution and habitat ==
The subspecies of the red-billed parrot have a disjunct distribution. They are found thus:

- P. s. saturatus, Colombia's Sierra Nevada de Santa Marta
- P. s. ponsi, from the foothills of Sierra Nevada de Santa Marta east into Serranía del Perijá that straddles the Colombia-Venezuela border
- P. s. sordidus, northern Venezuela from Falcón and Lara east to Miranda
- P. s. antelius, the northeastern Venezuelan states of Anzoátegui, Sucre, and Monagas
- P. s. corallinus, discontinuously from the Eastern Andes of Colombia south through eastern Ecuador to central Peru and separately in central Bolivia
- P. s. mindoensis, western Ecuador

The red-billed parrot inhabits a variety of wooded landscapes including the interior, clearings, and edges of humid to wet lowland and submontane evergreen and semi-deciduous forests; cloud-, secondary, and gallery forests; and coffee plantations. In elevation it is mostly found between 500 and 1,500 m (1,600 and 4,900 ft) but ranges as low as 100 m (300 ft) and as high as 2,400 m (7,900 ft).

== Behavior ==
=== Movement ===
The red-billed parrot makes some local seasonal movements in northern Venezuela but its movements, if any, in the rest of its range are not known.

=== Feeding ===
Little is known about the red-billed parrot's foraging behavior or diet, though the latter is known to include fruits and blossoms.

=== Breeding ===
The red-billed parrot's breeding season varies geographically. It spans February to April in Colombia and January to May in Ecuador; in Venezuela it includes April and in Bolivia includes October. It nests in holes in trees. The clutch size appears to usually be three eggs. The incubation period is about 27 days and fledging occurs about 12 weeks after hatch.

=== Vocalization ===
The red-billed parrot's flight calls appear to be different among the subspecies. P. s. sordidus and P. s. antelius make "a strident "kee!-yak" ". P. s. corallinus and P. s. mindoensis make "an upslurred "crree!" and a more mellow "crrah" ".

== Status ==
The IUCN has assessed the red-billed parrot as being of Least Concern. It has a very large range but its population size is not known and is believed to be decreasing. No immediate threats have been identified. It is considered fairly common in most of its range. Deforestation in Colombia and Venezuela has caused local declines. In general "however, the species persists in moderately disturbed habitat."
