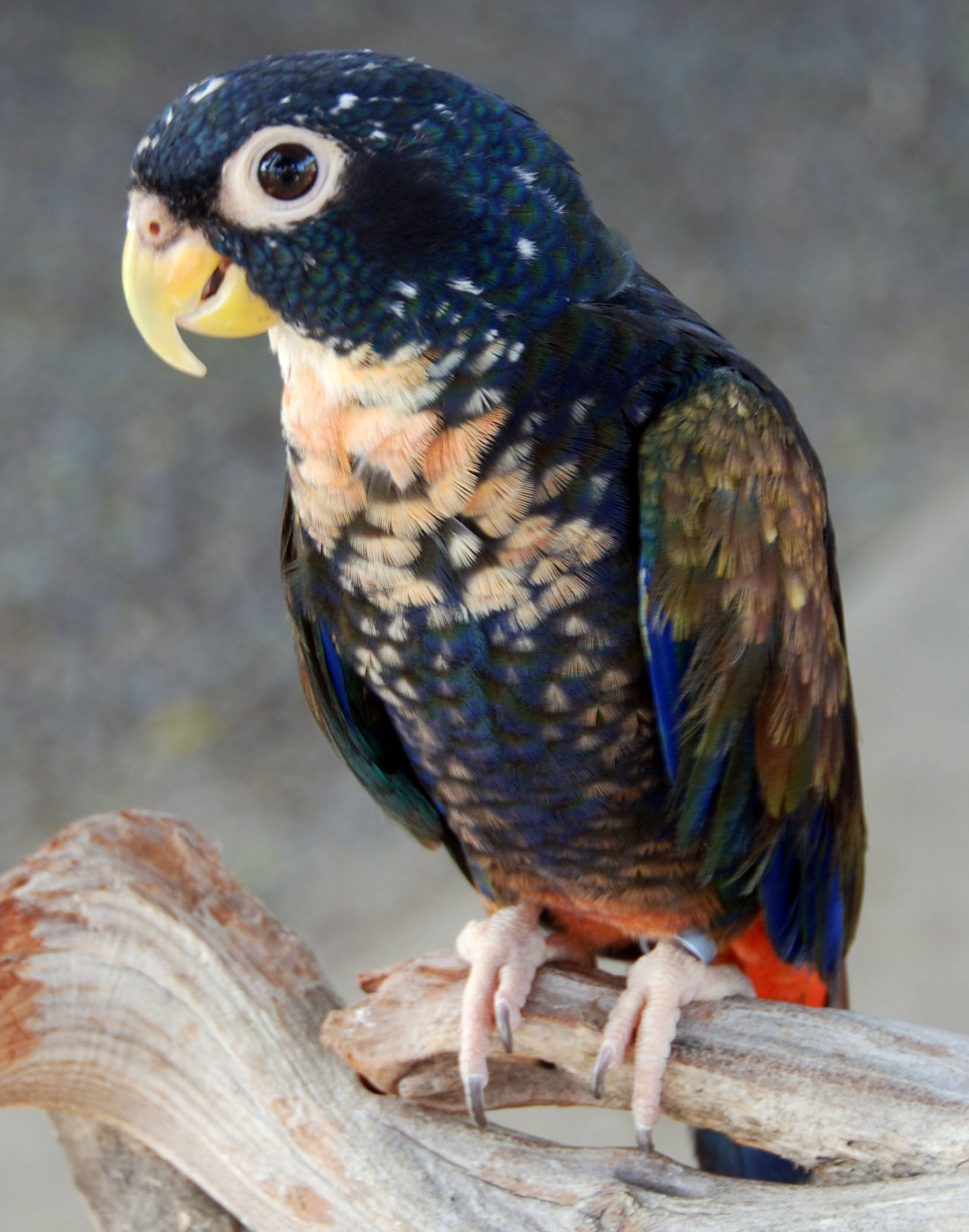

Conservation status
- Least Concern (IUCN 3.1)

Scientific classification
- Kingdom: Animalia
- Phylum: Chordata
- Class: Aves
- Order: Psittaciformes
- Family: Psittacidae
- Genus: Pionus
- Species: P. chalcopterus

Binomial name
- Pionus chalcopterus (Fraser, 1841)

= Bronze-winged parrot =

Species of bird

The bronze-winged parrot (Pionus chalcopterus) is a medium-sized pionus parrot 28 cm (11 in) long. It is a short-tailed stocky parrot found in forest and woodland in north-western South America.

== Description ==
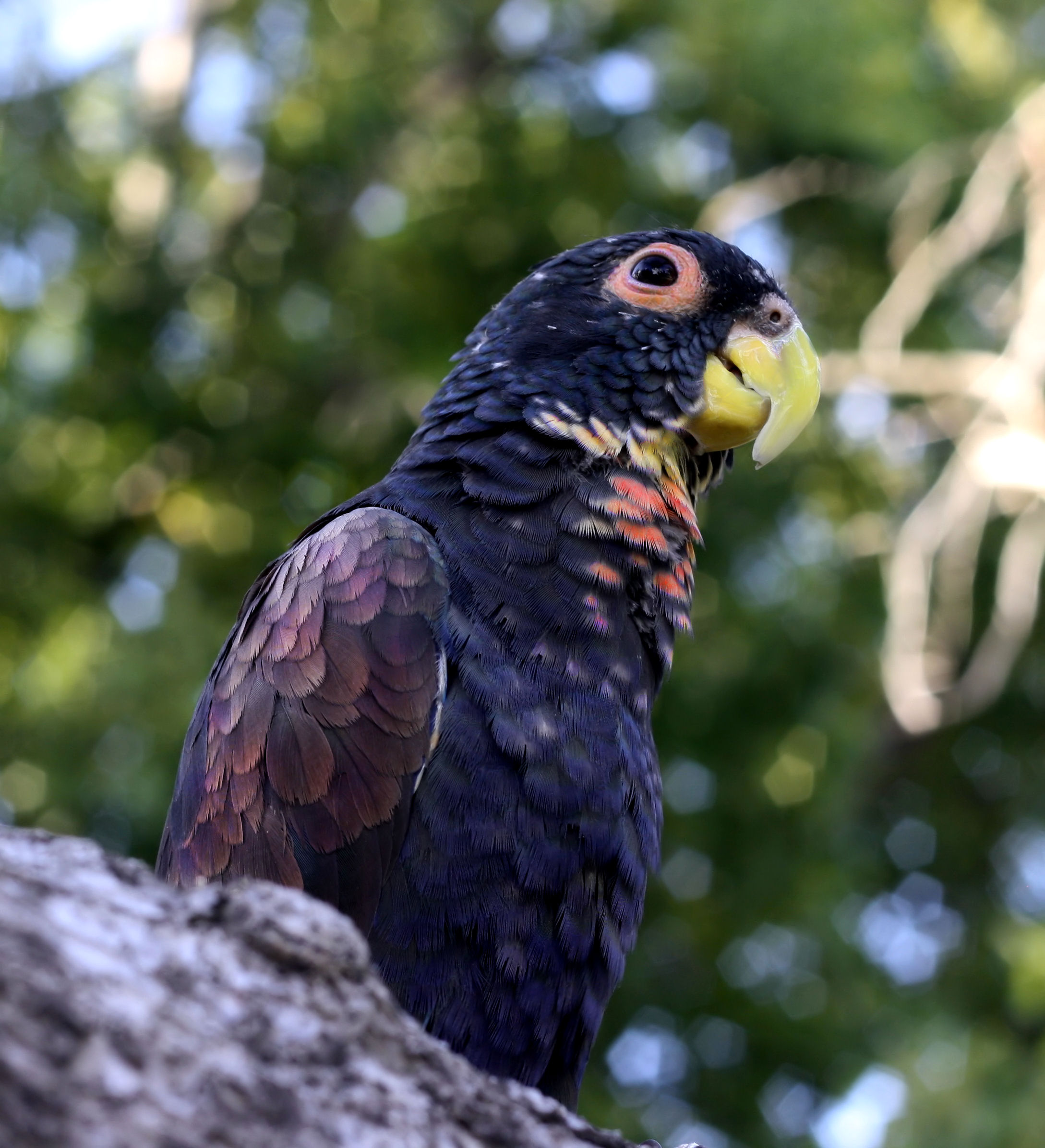
Pet parrot

The bronze-winged parrot is mainly dark with a whitish chin patch and its upper chest is speckled with pink feathers. It has short red undertail feathers. The rump, tail and wings are dark blue with lighter blue underwings. The head is dark blue-green; the mantle, back and underparts are dark bronze-green with some blue tipped feathers and sometimes scattered red feathers. Its beak is pale yellow. In adults the ring of bare skin around the eyes is pink. Juveniles have whitish eyerings and their underparts are brownish.

== Taxonomy ==
Today most authorities consider this species as monotypic, but some continue to recognize two subspecies:

- P. c. chalcopterus: west Venezuela, and north and central Colombia.
- P. b. cyanescens: south-west Colombia, west Ecuador, and north-west Peru. Reputedly with broader blue margins on feathers, chin patch and surrounding ring smaller and less distinct.

== Range and habitat ==
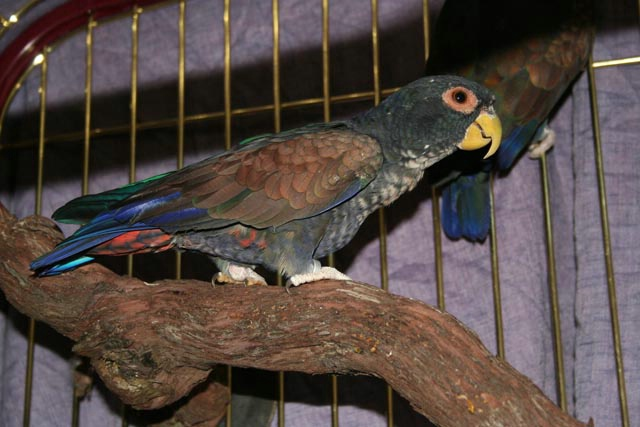
Side view

The bronze-winged parrot is found in far western Venezuela, western and central Colombia, western Ecuador and far north-western Peru. In Venezuela it mainly occurs at altitudes of 900–1400 m, in Colombia it mainly occurs at altitudes of 1400–2400 m (occasionally as high as 2800 m), in Ecuador mainly below 1400 m, and in Peru below 800 m. It generally prefers the canopy of forest and woodland (both humid and semi-deciduous), but also occurs in adjacent habitats with tall trees. It appears to be rather nomadic in parts of its range, but the movements (possibly only in response to the availability of food) are generally poorly understood.

== Behavior ==
It is typically seen in pairs or small groups of up to ten birds.

The bronze-winged parrot nests in tree cavities. The eggs are white and there are usually three to four in a clutch. The female incubates the eggs for about 26 days and the chicks leave the nest about 70 days after hatching.

== In the media ==
Bronze-winged parrots have received little attention in the media.

Evie, a three-year-old, female bronze-winged parrot, is featured in the television show Dr. K's exotic animal ER, on Nat Geo Wild Network, as the personal pet of Dr. Lauren Thielen.

Sora, a young, male bronze-winged parrot, is one of the mascots of TikToker and YouTuber Five's A Flock.
