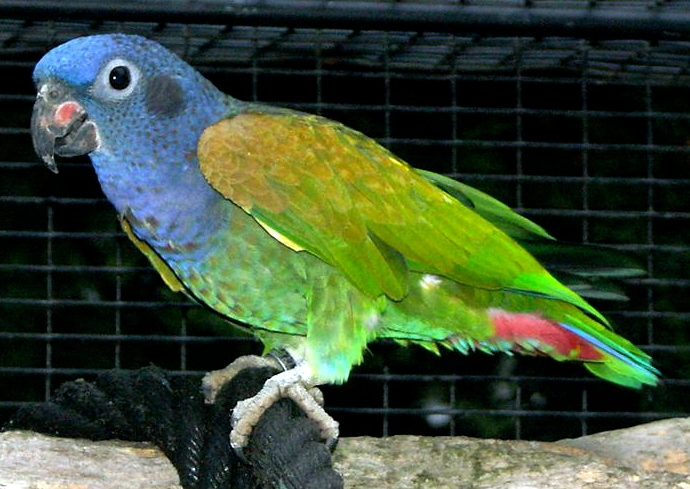

Conservation status
- Least Concern (IUCN 3.1)

Scientific classification
- Kingdom: Animalia
- Phylum: Chordata
- Class: Aves
- Order: Psittaciformes
- Family: Psittacidae
- Genus: Pionus
- Species: P. menstruus

Binomial name
- Pionus menstruus (Linnaeus, 1766)

Synonyms
- Psittacus menstruus Linnaeus, 1766

= Blue-headed parrot =

Species of bird

The blue-headed parrot, also known as the blue-headed pionus (Pionus menstruus) is a medium-sized parrot of about 27 cm (11 in) in length. The body is mostly green, with a blue head and neck, and red undertail coverts. It is a resident in tropical and subtropical South America and southern Central America, from Costa Rica, Venezuela and the Caribbean island of Trinidad south to Bolivia and Brazil.

Its habitat is forest and semi-open country, including cultivated areas. It is largely restricted to humid or semi-humid regions, but locally extends into drier habitats, at least along rivers. The blue-headed parrot lays three to five white eggs in a tree cavity.

Blue-headed parrots are noisy birds and make light, high-pitched squeaking sweenk calls. They eat fruit and seeds, and sometimes grain. They roost communally in palm and other trees, and large numbers can be seen at the roost sites at dawn and dusk.

Blue-headed parrots are popular as pets. Compared to other parrot species (like amazons) they are very quiet. They are affectionate, but not known for their talking ability.

== Taxonomy ==
The blue-headed parrot was formally described in 1766 by the Swedish naturalist Carl Linnaeus in the twelfth edition of his Systema Naturae. He placed it with all the other parrots in the genus Psittacus and coined the binomial name Psittacus menstruus. Linnaeus based his description on earlier accounts by Mathurin Jacques Brisson and George Edwards. In 1760 Brisson had published a description of "Le perroquet a teste bleue de la Guiane" from a preserved specimen that had been collected in French Guiana. In 1764 Edwards had included a description and a hand-coloured etching of a live bird in the third volume of his Gleanings of Natural History. The blue-headed parrot is now one of eight parrots placed in the genus Pionus that was introduced in 1832 by the German naturalist Johann Georg Wagler. The genus name is from Ancient Greek piōn, pionos meaning "fat". The specific epithet menstruus is Latin meaning "menstrual".

Three subspecies are recognised:

- P. m. rubrigularis Cabanis, 1881 – north Costa Rica to west Ecuador
- P. m. menstruus (Linnaeus, 1766) – east Colombia to north Bolivia, the Guianas and northeast Brazil
- P. m. reichenowi Heine, 1884 – east Brazil

Birdlife International and the International Union for Conservation of Nature treat the subspecies P. m. reichenowi as a separate species, the blue-breasted parrot (Pionus reichenowi).

== Description ==
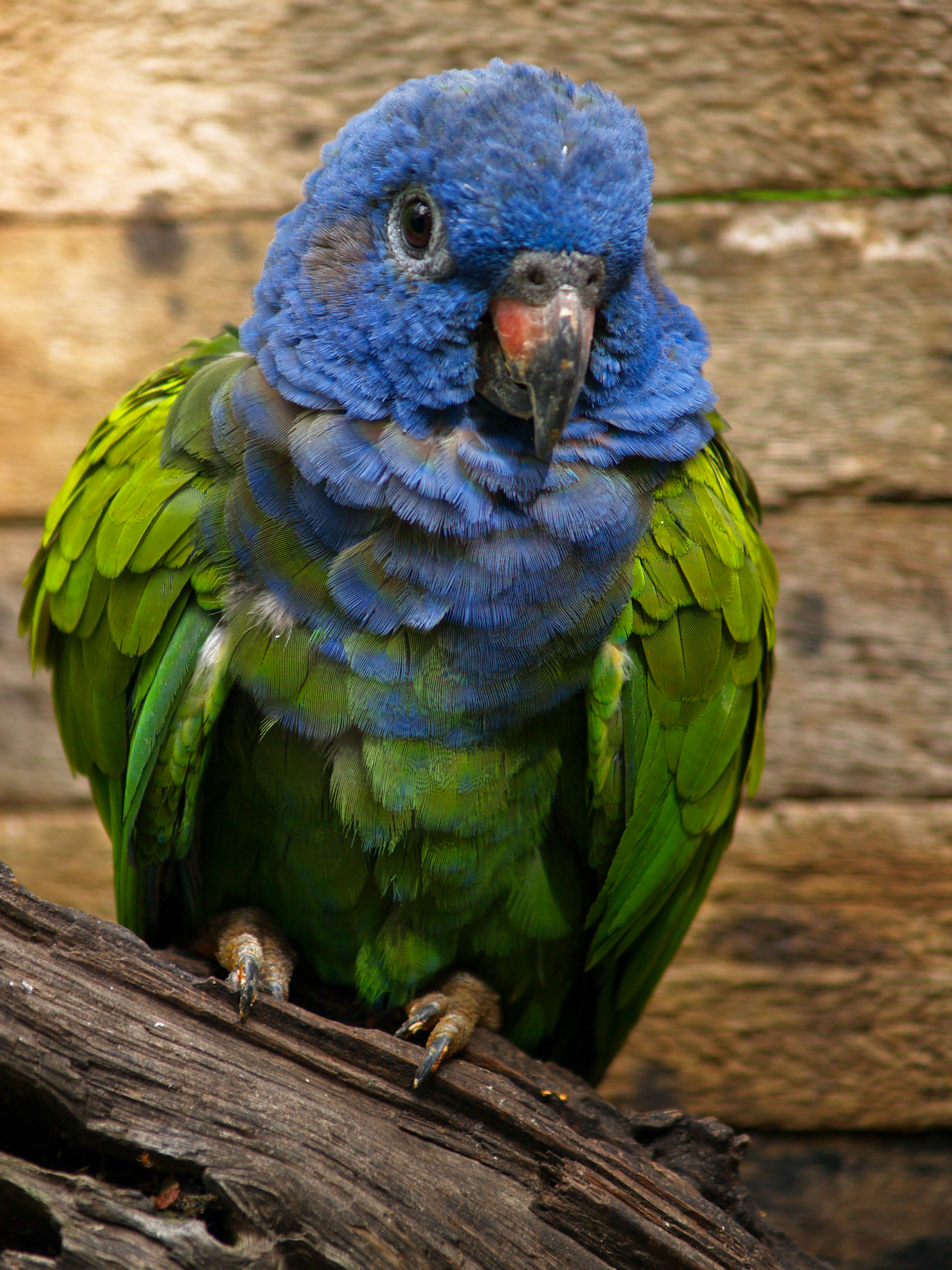
At La Senda Verde Animal Refuge, Bolivia

The blue-headed parrot is about 28 cm (11 in) long and weighs 245 g (8.6 oz). It is mainly green with a blue head, neck and upper breast, red undertail coverts, and some yellowish on the wing coverts. The upper mandible is black with reddish areas on both sides. They have dark ear patches. In addition to the well-known nominate subspecies found throughout most of the species' South American range, there are two more localized subspecies: rubrigularis from southern Central America and the Chocó has an overall paler plumage and typically a relatively distinct pinkish patch on the throat, and reichenowi from the Atlantic Forest in east Brazil has a paler bill and most of the underparts blue. In all subspecies the male and the female are alike, and juvenile birds have less blue on the head, as well as red or pinkish feathers around the ceres. They moult into their adult plumage at about 8 months of age, but it can take up to two years for the full blue hood to emerge.

== Range ==
In South America, the blue-headed parrot is mainly an Amazonian species, including in the southeast the neighboring Araguaia-Tocantins River system as its eastern limit; a disjunct population lives southeastwards on Brazil's South Atlantic coast, a coastal strip from Pernambuco in the north to Espírito Santo state in the south, about 1500 km long. In northwest South America the range continues into Central American Panama to Costa Rica. It avoids the northern Andes cordillera spine, and a smaller contiguous area of central Venezuela and northern Colombia. A Pacific Ocean coastal strip continues the range, from southern Ecuador, north to Caribbean areas of northwestern Colombia and western Venezuela.

== Behaviour ==
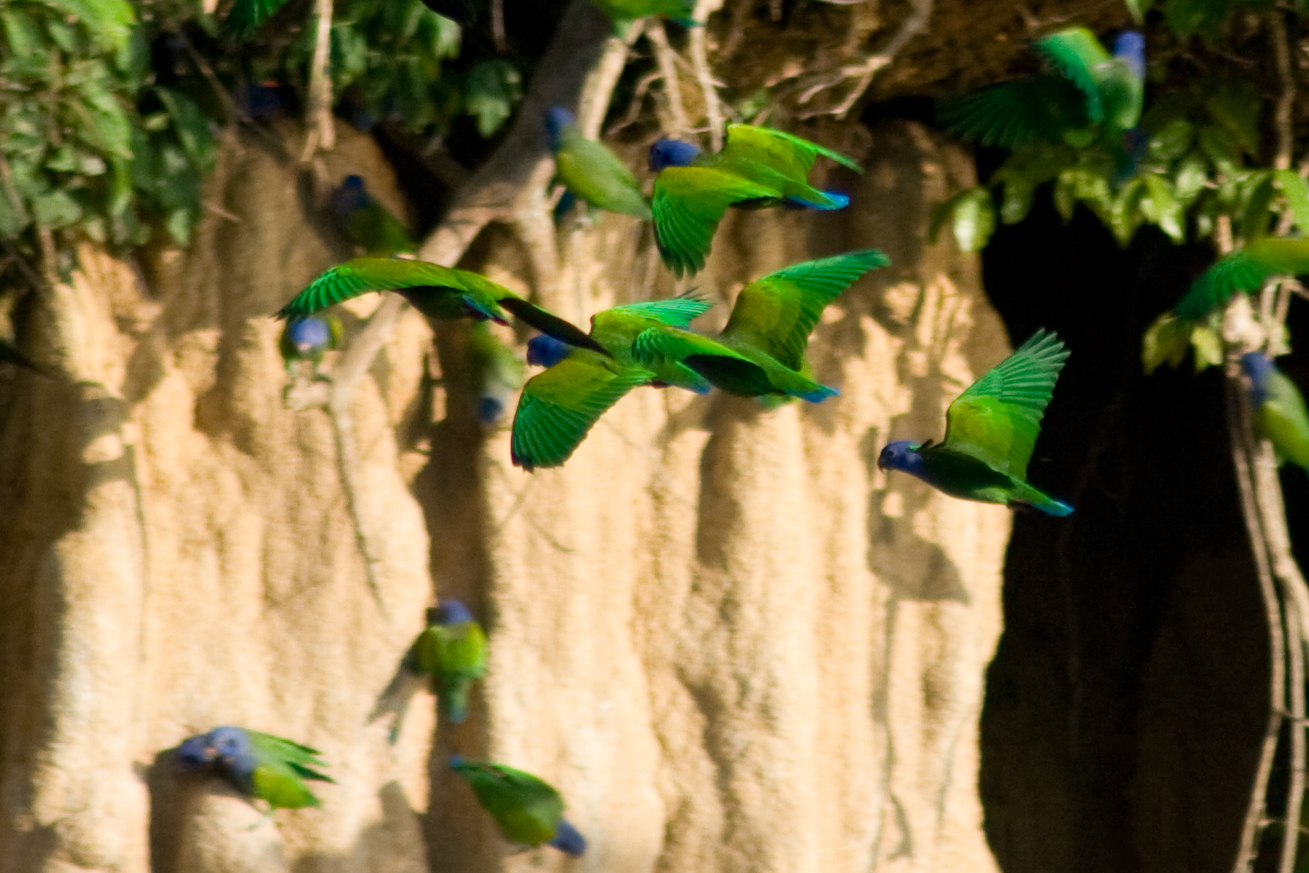
At a clay lick in Peru

=== Food and feeding ===
They eat fruit, flowers and seeds, and sometimes grain.

=== Breeding ===
The blue-headed parrot nests in tree cavities. The eggs are white and there are usually three to five in a clutch. The female incubates the eggs for about 26 days and the chicks leave the nest about 70 days after hatching.

== Gallery ==
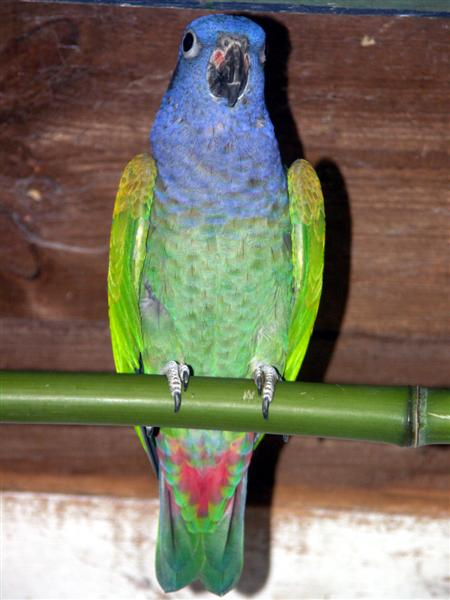
On perch

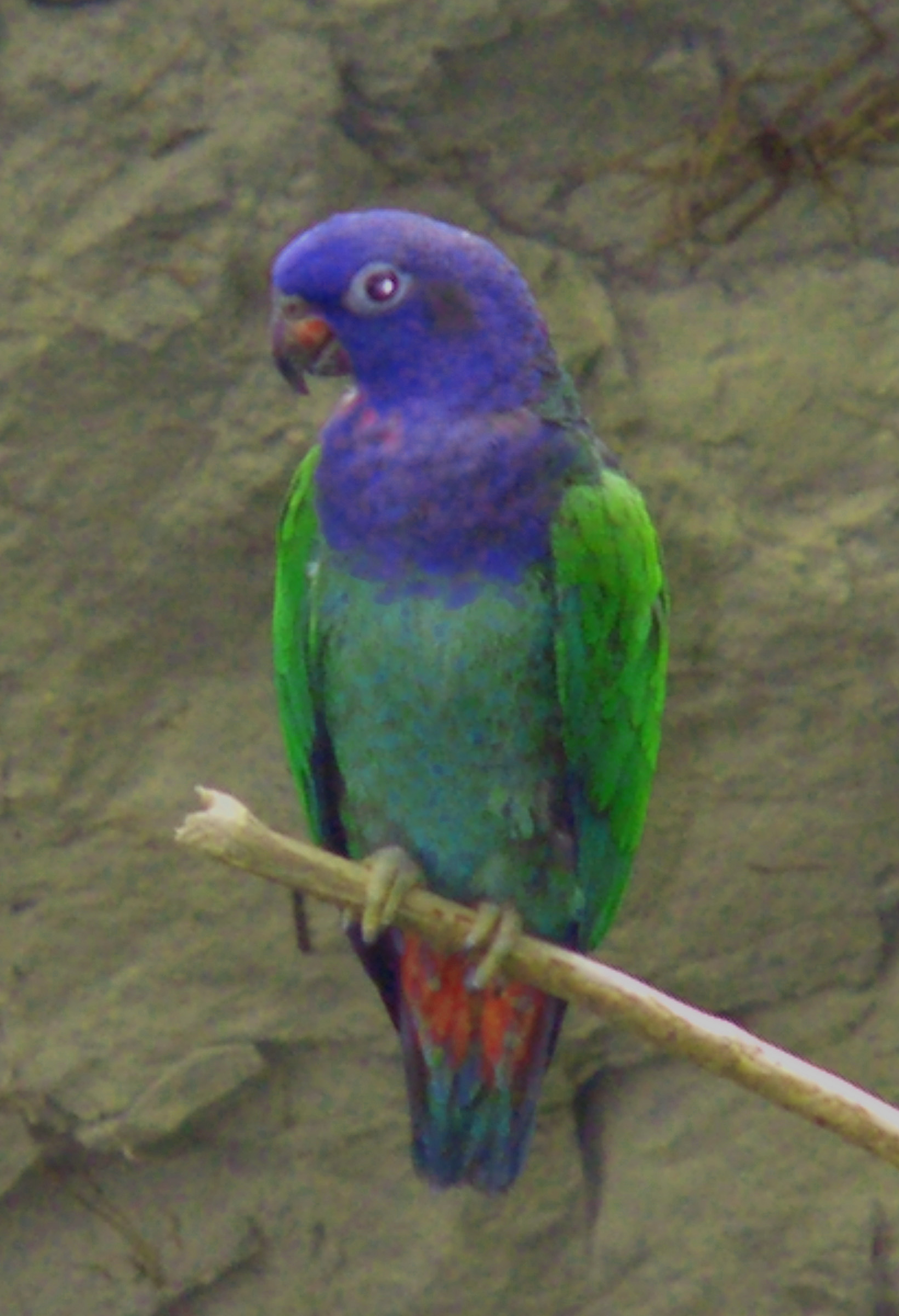
On perch

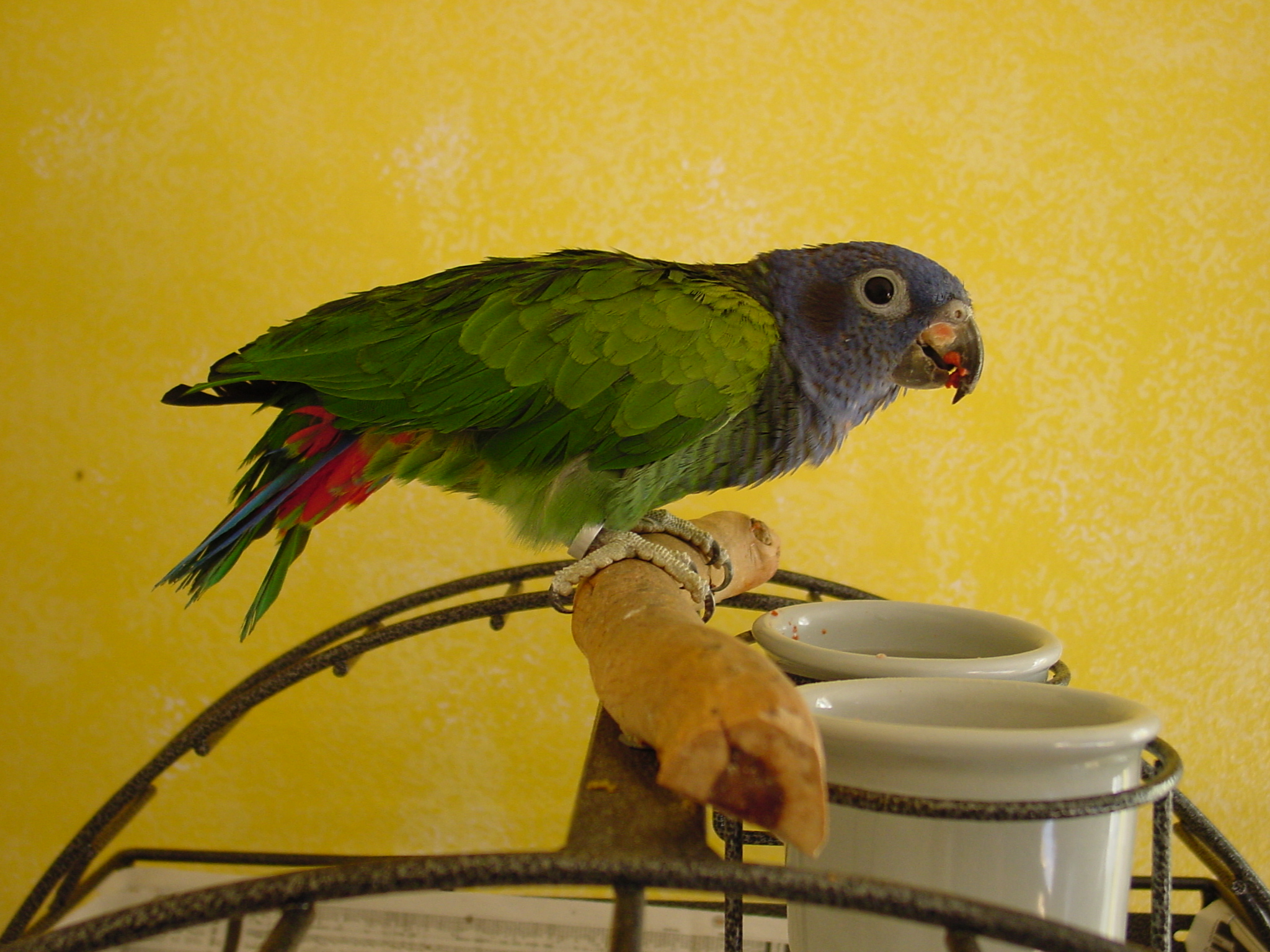
Pet parrot

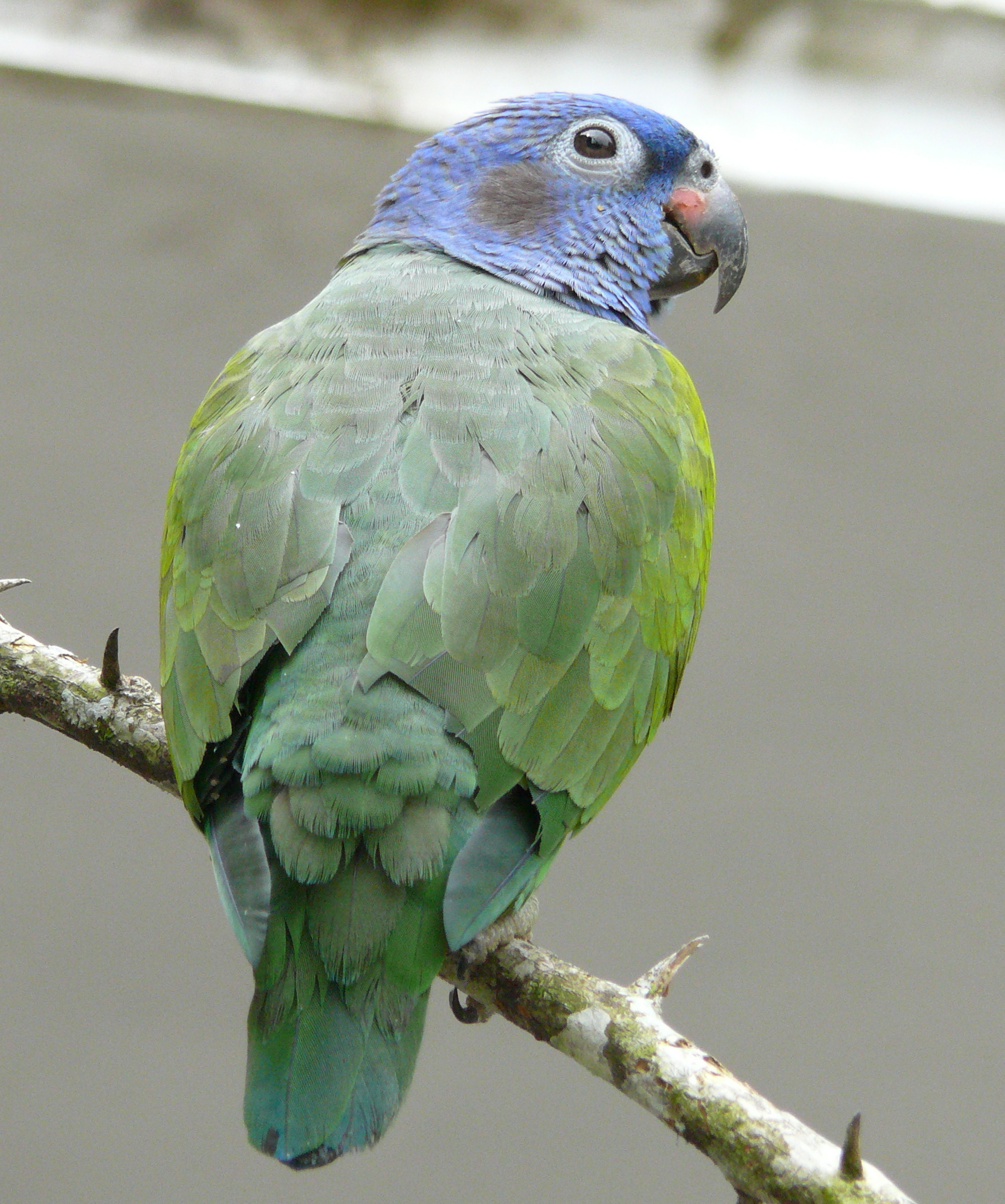
Back
