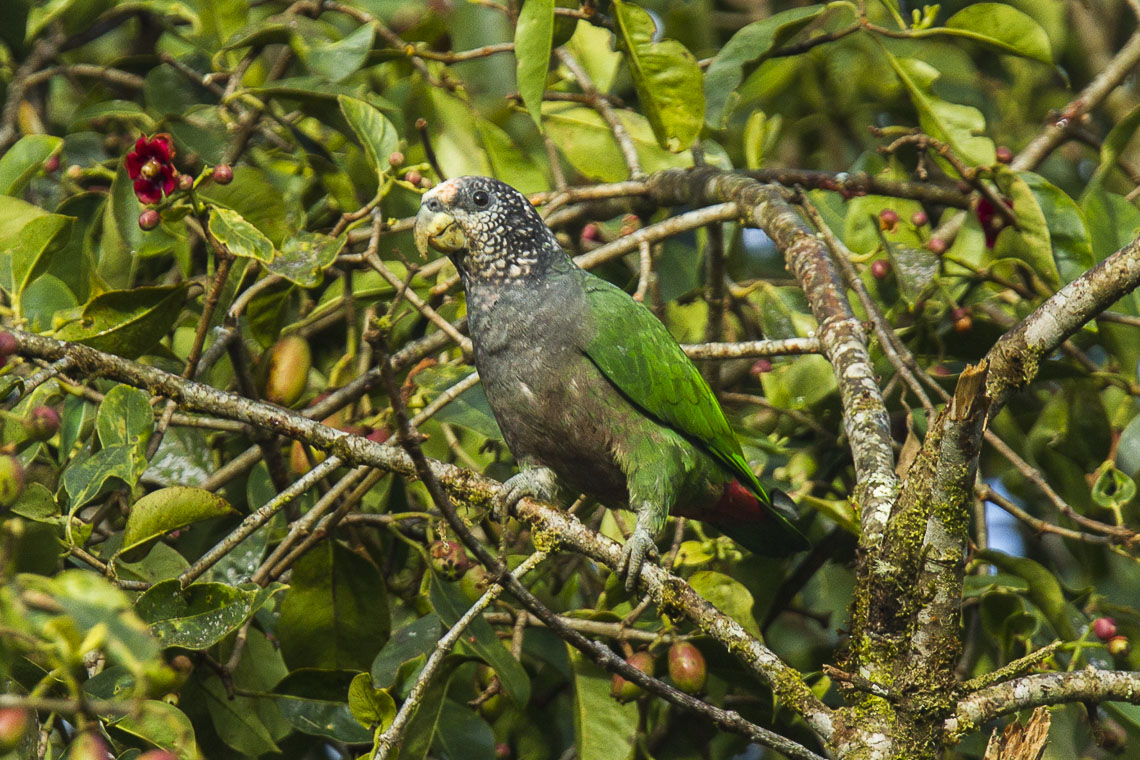

Conservation status
- Least Concern (IUCN 3.1)
- CITES Appendix II

Scientific classification
- Kingdom: Animalia
- Phylum: Chordata
- Class: Aves
- Order: Psittaciformes
- Family: Psittacidae
- Genus: Pionus
- Species: P. seniloides

Binomial name
- Pionus seniloides (Massena & Souancé, 1854)

Synonyms
- Speckle-faced parrot (White-capped), P. tumultuosus selinoides

= White-capped parrot =

Species of bird

The white-capped parrot (Pionus seniloides) or white-capped pionus is a species of bird in subfamily Arinae of the family Psittacidae, the African and New World parrots. It is found in Colombia, Ecuador, Peru, and Venezuela.

== Taxonomy and systematics ==
The white-capped parrot's taxonomy has not been settled. The International Ornithological Committee and BirdLife International's Handbook of the Birds of the World consider it to be a full species. The South American Classification Committee of the American Ornithological Society (SACC) and the Clements taxonomy treat it and the plum-crowned parrot (P. tumultuosus) as subspecies of the speckle-faced parrot under the binomial P. tumultuosus. The SACC declined to split the speckle-faced in 2005 but recognizes that a 2007 study suggests that the split is valid.

== Description ==
The white-capped parrot is 28 to 30 cm (11 to 12 in) long and weighs about 229 g (8.1 oz). The adult's forehead is white, sometimes with some scattered pink feathers. Their crown, the rest of their face, their throat and their breast are dusky violet or dull purple with plum pink flecks. Their back, wings, and belly are green. Their undertail coverts and the base of their tail are red; the rest of their tail is green with some blue on the outer feathers. Their bill is pale yellowish horn-colored, their iris dark with whitish skin around it, and their legs and feet gray.

== Distribution and habitat ==
The white-capped parrot is found from western Venezuela through Colombia's Eastern Andes and both slopes of the Andes in Ecuador into northwestern Peru. It inhabits the canopy and edges of subtropical and temperate forest at elevations between 1,500 and 3,200 m (4,900 and 10,500 ft).

== Behavior ==
=== Movement ===
The white-capped parrot is highly nomadic. It "does not seem to be resident anywhere" and may make seasonal elevational movements.

=== Feeding ===
Little is known about the white-capped parrot's foraging behavior or diet. It is known to feed on fruits; those of Turpinia paniculata and members of family Clusiaceae have been identified.

=== Breeding ===
The white-capped parrot is thought to breed in November and December. Its breeding biology in the wild is not known; in captivity its clutch size is four eggs and the incubation period is about 26 days. In the wild it is assumed to nest in tree cavities like others of its genus.

=== Vocalization ===
The white-capped parrot's calls have been described as resembling those of Aratinga parakeets, for instance "kreeyah-kreeyah-kreeyahkreeyah". It makes these calls both in flight and when perched.

== Status ==
The IUCN has assessed the white-capped parrot as being of Least Concern. It has a large range but its population size is not known and is believed to be decreasing. No immediate threats have been identified. It is considered uncommon.
