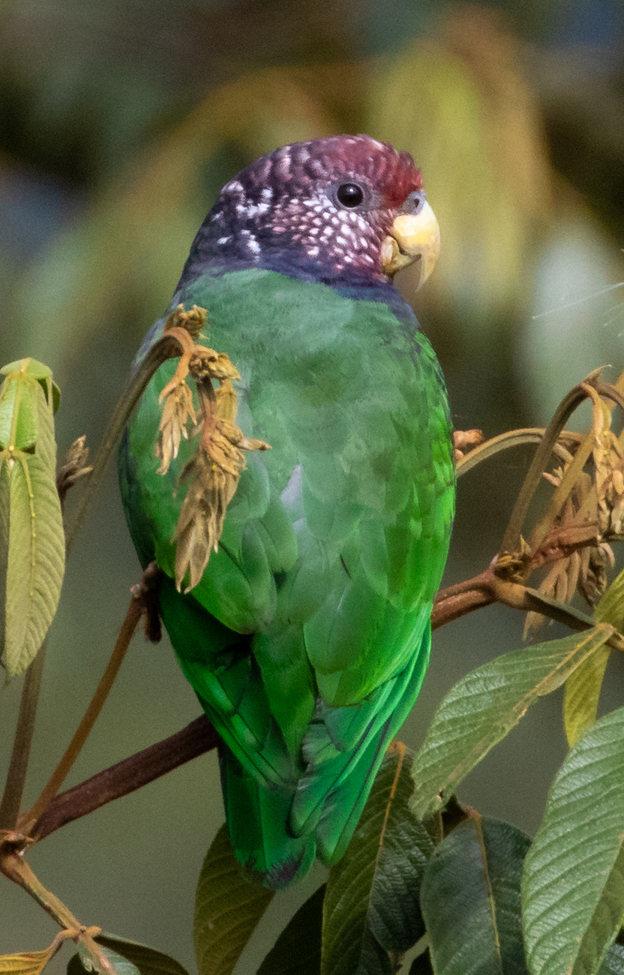

Conservation status
- Least Concern (IUCN 3.1)
- CITES Appendix II

Scientific classification
- Kingdom: Animalia
- Phylum: Chordata
- Class: Aves
- Order: Psittaciformes
- Family: Psittacidae
- Genus: Pionus
- Species: P. tumultuosus

Binomial name
- Pionus tumultuosus (Tschudi, 1844)

Synonyms
- Speckle-faced parrot (plum-crowned), P. tumultuosus tumultuosus

= Plum-crowned parrot =

Species of bird

The speckle-faced parrot or plum-crowned parrot (Pionus tumultuosus) or plum-crowned pionus is a species of bird in subfamily Arinae of the family Psittacidae, the African and New World parrots. It is found in Bolivia and Peru.

== Taxonomy and systematics ==
The plum-crowned parrot's taxonomy has not been settled. The International Ornithological Committee and BirdLife International's Handbook of the Birds of the World consider it to be a full species. The South American Classification Committee of the American Ornithological Society (SACC) and the Clements taxonomy treat it and the white-capped parrot (P. seniloides) as subspecies of the speckle-faced parrot under the binomial P. tumultuosus. The SACC declined to split the speckle-faced in 2005 but recognizes that a 2007 study suggests that the split is valid.

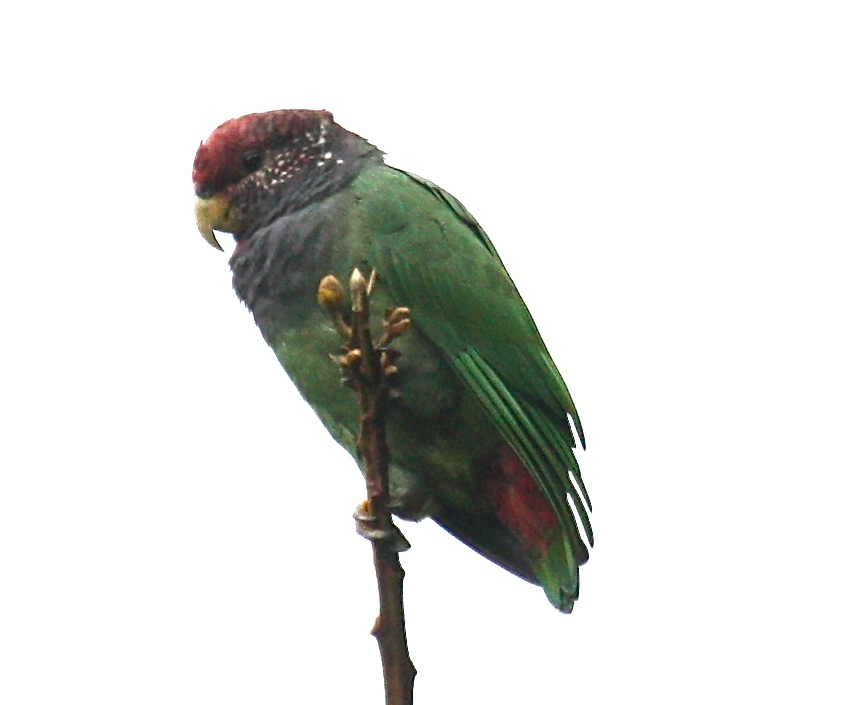
Plum-crowned parrot in cloud forest near Cock-of-the-Rock Lodge, Peru

== Description ==
The plum-crowned parrot is 29 to 30 cm (11 to 12 in) long and weighs about 229 g (8.1 oz). Adults' forehead and crown are plum and the rest of their face, their throat, and their breast are dull purple with plum pink flecks. Their back, wings, and belly are green. Their undertail coverts and the base of their tail are red; the rest of their tail is green with some blue on the outer feathers. Their bill is pale yellowish horn-colored, their iris dark with grayish skin around it, and their legs and feet gray. Immature birds have a brownish green crown and breast, white speckles on their ear coverts, and yellowish green undertail coverts.

== Distribution and habitat ==
The plum-crowned parrot is found on the east side of the Andes from the Department of Huánuco in central Peru east through Bolivia into Santa Cruz Department. It inhabits humid subtropical forest and cloudforest, especially areas with bamboo, and visits nearby agricultural areas as well. In elevation it mostly occurs between 2,000 and 3,300 m (6,600 and 10,800 ft).

== Behavior ==
=== Movement ===
The plum-crowned parrot is somewhat nomadic.

=== Feeding ===
Little is known about the plum-crowned parrot's foraging behavior or diet. It is known to feed on fruits; those of Turpinia paniculata and members of family Clusiaceae have been identified. It also feeds in maize fields.

=== Breeding ===
The plum-crowned parrot is thought to breed in November and December. Its breeding biology in the wild is not known; in captivity its clutch size is four eggs and the incubation period is about 26 days. In the wild it is assumed to nest in tree cavities like others of its genus.

=== Vocalization ===
The plum-crowned parrot's flight call is "a low, harsh crrah." It makes a variety of "conversational" calls, some of them nasal, when perched.

== Status ==
The IUCN has assessed the plum-crowned parrot as being of least concern. It has a fairly large range but its population size is not known and is believed to be decreasing. No immediate threats have been identified. It is considered "[g]enerally uncommon and local".
