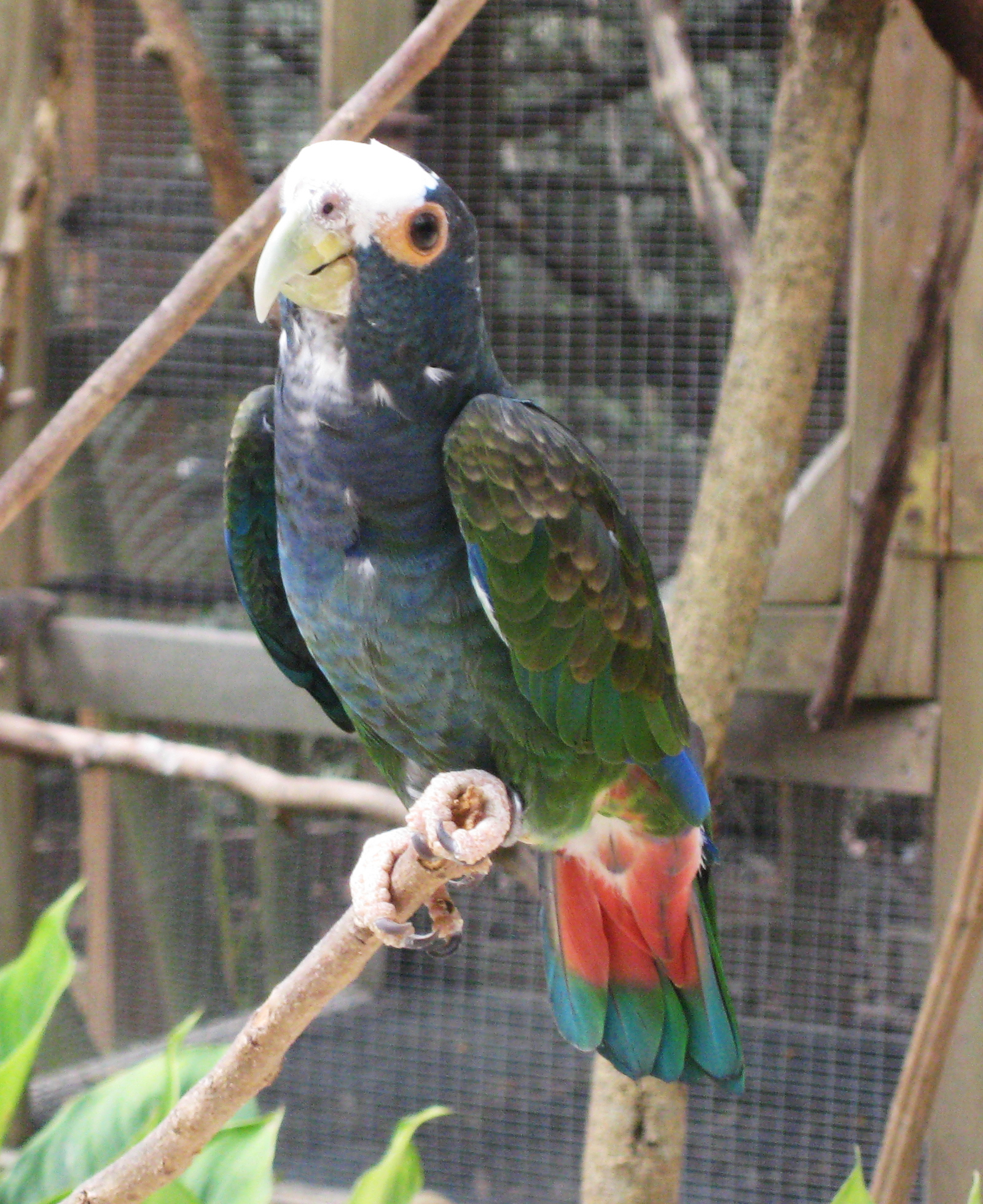
- White-crowned parrot, Pionus senilis, at Macaw Mountain Bird Park, Honduras

Scientific classification
- Kingdom: Animalia
- Phylum: Chordata
- Class: Aves
- Order: Psittaciformes
- Family: Psittacidae
- Tribe: Androglossini
- Genus: Pionus; Wagler, 1832

Type species
- Psittacus menstruus (blue-headed parrot) Linnaeus, 1766

Species
- 7-10, see text

= Pionus =

Genus of birds

Pionus is a genus of medium-sized parrots native to Mexico, and Central and South America. Characteristic of the genus are the chunky body, bare eye ring (which can vary in color), and short square tail. They are superficially similar to Amazon parrots, but smaller, and in flight their wing-strokes are far deeper. Coloration is generally subdued yet complex compared to member species of the genus Amazona; under bright lighting, their feathers shimmer with iridescent brilliance. All species share bright red undertail coverts; the scientific name of one species, the blue-headed parrot (P. menstruus), refers to this. Males and females are similar, with no notable sexual dimorphism.

== Taxonomy ==
The genus Pionus was introduced in 1832 by the German naturalist Johann Georg Wagler. He listed 15 species in his new genus but did not specify the type. In 1840 the English zoologist George Robert Gray designated the type as Psittacus menstruus Linnaeus, 1766, the blue-headed parrot. The name Pionus is from Ancient Greek piōn, pionos meaning "fat".

A small number of authorities have suggested the blue-headed parrot should be split into two or three species.

=== Species ===
The genus contains seven species.

| Image | Common name | Scientific name | Distribution |
|---|---|---|---|
| | Dusky parrot | Pionus fuscus | |
| | Red-billed parrot | Pionus sordidus | |
| | Scaly-headed parrot | Pionus maximiliani | |
| | Plum-crowned parrot | Pionus tumultuosus | |
| | Blue-headed parrot | Pionus menstruus | |
| | White-crowned parrot | Pionus senilis | |
| | Bronze-winged parrot | Pionus chalcopterus | |

== Pets ==
Pionus parrots are regarded as excellent pets, although some species are very rare in captivity. Most commonly kept species are the blue-headed, Maximilian (scaly-headed) and white-capped. Others, such as the dusky and the bronze-winged, have become more common due to captive breeding.

Pionus parrots are quieter than Amazon parrots. Unlike some other companion parrots, aviculturists have noted that they are not particularly energetic, and do not generally enjoy hands-on play (for example, being flipped on their backs), but they do provide companionship and are described as gentle and charming pets.

When excited or frightened, birds of this genus emit a characteristic wheezing or snorting sound that is sometimes mistaken for a sign of distress, or a symptom of disease. They also give off a musky or sweet odor that some caretakers find unpleasant, but others enjoy.

=== Health ===
Pionus parrots are susceptible to obesity, vitamin A deficiency and aspergillosis in captivity. These conditions, with the exception of aspergillosis, are easily prevented.

=== Diet ===
As a species, the Pionus naturally eats mostly fruits, especially guavas. Pet owners should take care to not feed their bird any high-fat foods. Pet stores often carry banana chips (which are good snacks for many other birds) that are fried in oil to make them crispy, but they contain too much fat for the Pionus and could result in high cholesterol or other health issues related to too much fat intake.

Pionus owners should consult a knowledgeable veterinarian (preferably a South American exotic bird expert) on proper Pionus dietary needs.
