= Bathyceratias =

Hypothetical species of anglerfish

Else Bostelmann illustration, 1934

Bathyceratias trilynchnus, the three-starred anglerfish, is a hypothetical species of anglerfish observed by William Beebe while in his bathysphere on 11 August 1934, at a depth of 2,470 feet (750 metres) off the coast of Bermuda.

== Description ==
Beebe first witnessed the fish from a distance, with its light faintly reflecting on its back. Getting a clearer view once it swam into the beam of his bathysphere, it was described as similar to Ceratias and Cryptopsaras, but with a flattened mouth and short, even teeth. It was ovoid, black in color, six inches (15 cm) in length, and possessed three illicium, each tipped with a pale yellow light organ.

== Current status ==
As with the other four species described by Beebe during his bathysphere dives, the three-starred anglerfish has not been observed since.

== See also ==
- Abyssal rainbow gar
- Bathyembryx
- Bathysidus
- Bathysphaera
