= Abyssal rainbow gar =

Hypothetical species of fish

Else Bostelmann illustration, 1934

The abyssal rainbow gar is a hypothetical species of fish observed by William Beebe while in his bathysphere on 11 August 1934, at a depth of 2,500 feet (760 metres) off the coast of Bermuda.

== Description ==
At 11:17 a.m. on 11 August 1934, Beebe activated the 1500-watt light of his bathysphere once at depth. In the illuminated water, he observed a quartet of slender fish with sharply pointed jaws oriented upright, each four inches (10 cm) in length. Beebe described the heads and jaws of the fish as scarlet, the back of their gills as a strong blue, and their posteriors and tails as a clear yellow. The group of fish gradually swam away into the darkness.

Although he named them abyssal rainbow gars, Beebe stated that they may have been "anything but gars", asserting with even less equivocation that "they are probably not gars". (Note: Gars are primarily freshwater fish and are not found in the deep sea.)

== See also ==
- Bathyceratias
- Bathyembryx
- Bathysidus
- Bathysphaera
