= Bathyembryx =

Cryptid

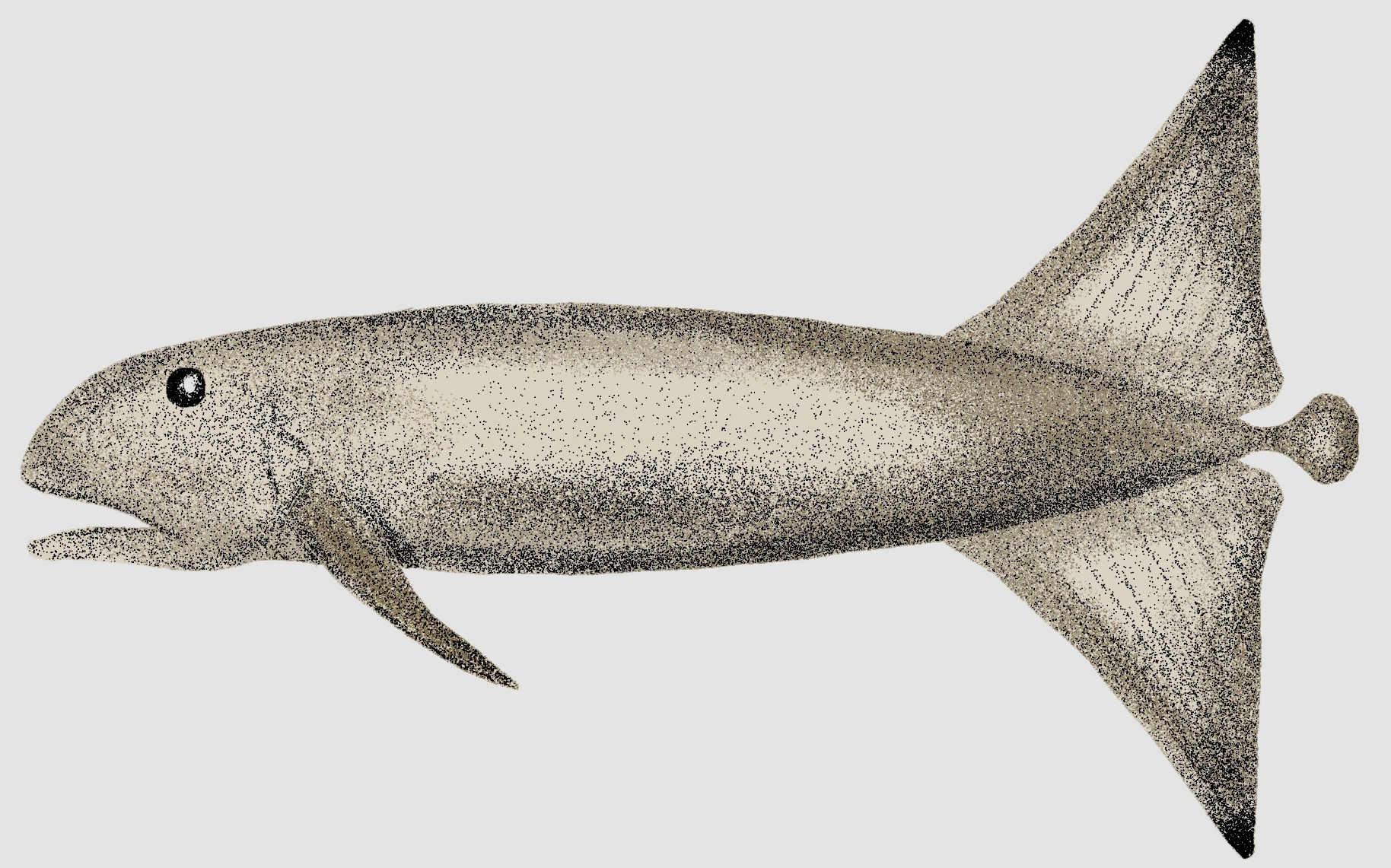
An illustration based on Else Bostelmann's reconstruction. Note the missing pelvic fins, that were omitted by Beebe as he had been unable to see them.

Bathyembryx istiophasma, the pallid sailfin, is a hypothetical species of fish observed by William Beebe on 11 August 1934. He described seeing the species twice during the same dive at depths of 1,500 feet (460 m) and 2,500 feet (760 m) near the coast of Bermuda.

== Background ==
The "bathysphere," as termed by Beebe, was a new yet primitive invention. It was a rounded steel enclosure with space adequate for two people, its external layer being 1.25 inches (3.2 cm). On the side, there was a single window made of fused quartz, 8 inches (20 cm) across and 3 inches (7.6 cm) thick. It was fitted with a heavy steel door that had to be bolted on. With no manoeuvrability, the navigation of this steel submersible was solely dependent on the ship it had been attached to. Beebe had no camera brought with him to these great depth, and instead described the species in detail to Else Bostelmann, an artist who proceeded to illustrate his findings. From 1930 to 1934, this submersible was used by Beebe in his deep-sea expedition.

== The encounter ==
"Without my seeing how it got there, a large fish swung suspended, half in, half out of the beam."

— William Beebe, Half Mile Down

Beebe had begun to fathom what he had seen. Within moments, he had prepared a description for the new creature. He had stated it was large for a deep-sea fish, reaching a length of "two feet" at the very least. The fish was completely non-luminous and had a small eye as well as a decently-sized mouth. The pectoral fins were long and wide but filamentous.

Two features on the sailfin stood out, according to Beebe. He described the colour as sickly, pale, and olive-coloured. In his own words, "the hue of water-soaked flesh". The caudal fin was reduced, much like a "button". The "vertical" fins, which are assumed to be the anal and dorsal fins, extended greatly beyond its body. He admitted that he did not see the pelvic fins, and thus the illustration subsequently produced lacked them.

Beebe called the fish Pallid Sailfin and assigned the scientific name Bathyembryx istiophasma, whose etymology he explained as "a Grecian way of saying it comes from the deep abyss and swims with ghostly sails." He placed it in the family Cetomimidae.

== Status of existence ==
Of the five new fish described by Beebe during the Bathysphere dives, none of them were confirmed to exist. The existence of all fishes were supported by his colleague Otis Barton, who descended with him in the submersible. Many speculate that the species is a misidentified species of squid.

== See also ==
- Abyssal rainbow gar
- Bathyceratias
- Bathysidus
- Bathysphaera
