= Bathysidus =

Cryptid

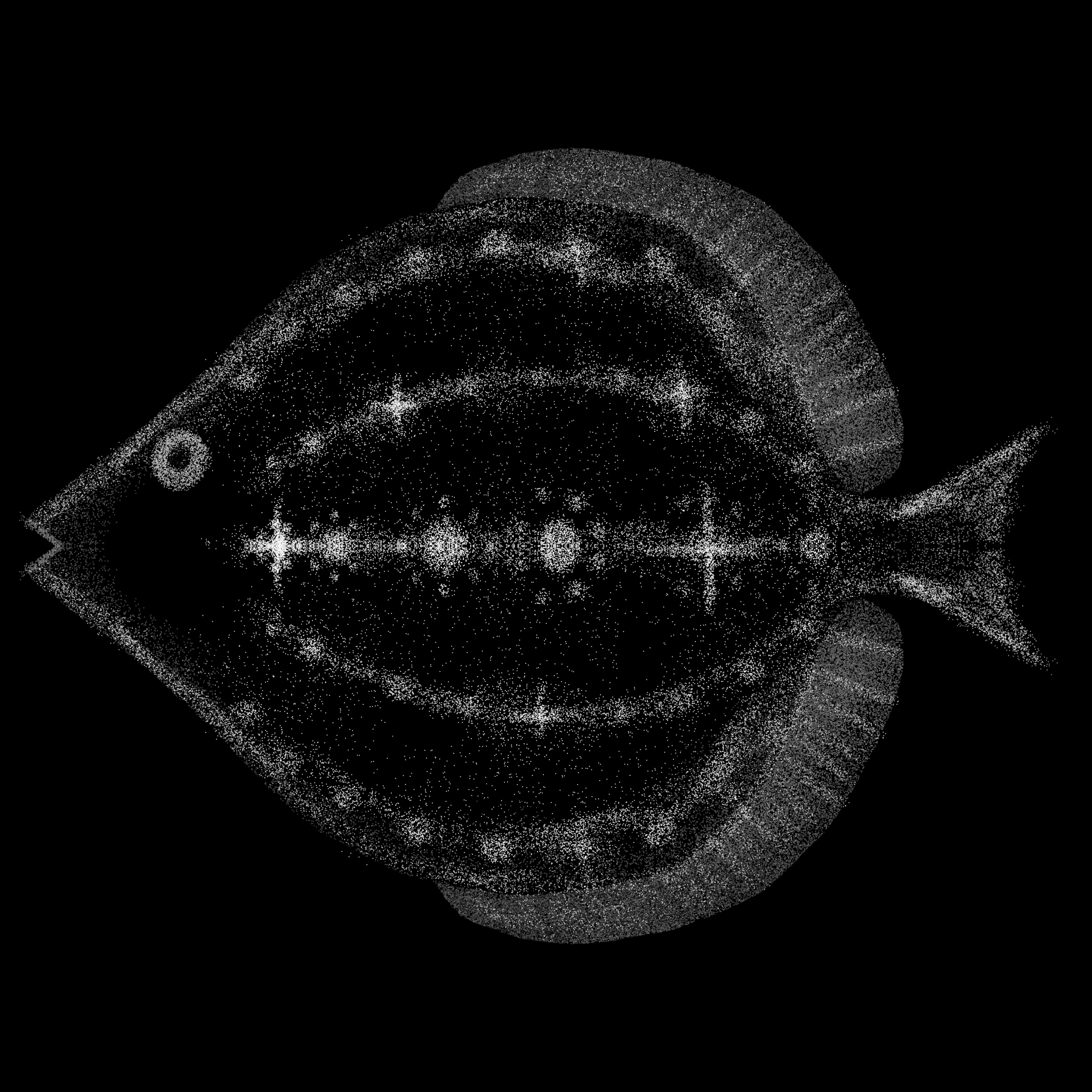
An illustration based on Else Bostelmann's reconstruction

Bathysidus pentagrammus, the five-lined constellation fish, is a hypothetical species of fish that was described by William Beebe on 11 August 1934, being spotted by the biologist as he descended to a depth of 580 metres (1900 feet) off the coast of Bermuda.

== Background ==
The "bathysphere" was a new invention, being a rounded steel enclosure with space for two people, a 3 cm (1.2 in) thick external hull, and a single window, 15 cm (5.9 in) in diameter. Maneuverability was solely dependent on the ship it was tethered to. Beebe had no camera with him and instead described the species in detail to Else Bostelmann, an artist who proceeded to illustrate his findings.

== Encounter ==
"A small school of luminous fish had just passed, when, fortunately at a moment of suspension, came a new and gorgeous creature."

— William Beebe, Half Mile Down page 212

The fish was seen in solitude. It was described by Beebe as resembling a surgeon or butterflyfish. It was disc-like in appearance, 12 cm high and 15 cm across. Its fins were continuous and vertical; its eyes large. Bebe was intrigued by this fish's striking bioluminescence, which he described in the book Half Mile Down: "along the sides of the body were five unbelievably beautiful lines of light ... each line was composed of a series of large, pale yellow lights, and every one of these was surrounded by a semicircle of very small, but intensely purple photophores."

Explicitly impressed with its luminescence, Beebe assigned the fish a taxonomic name, Bathysidus pentagrammus. When translated, it roughly means "five-lined star of the depths". He then states: "In my memory it will live throughout the rest of my life as one of the loveliest things I have ever seen."

== Status of existence ==
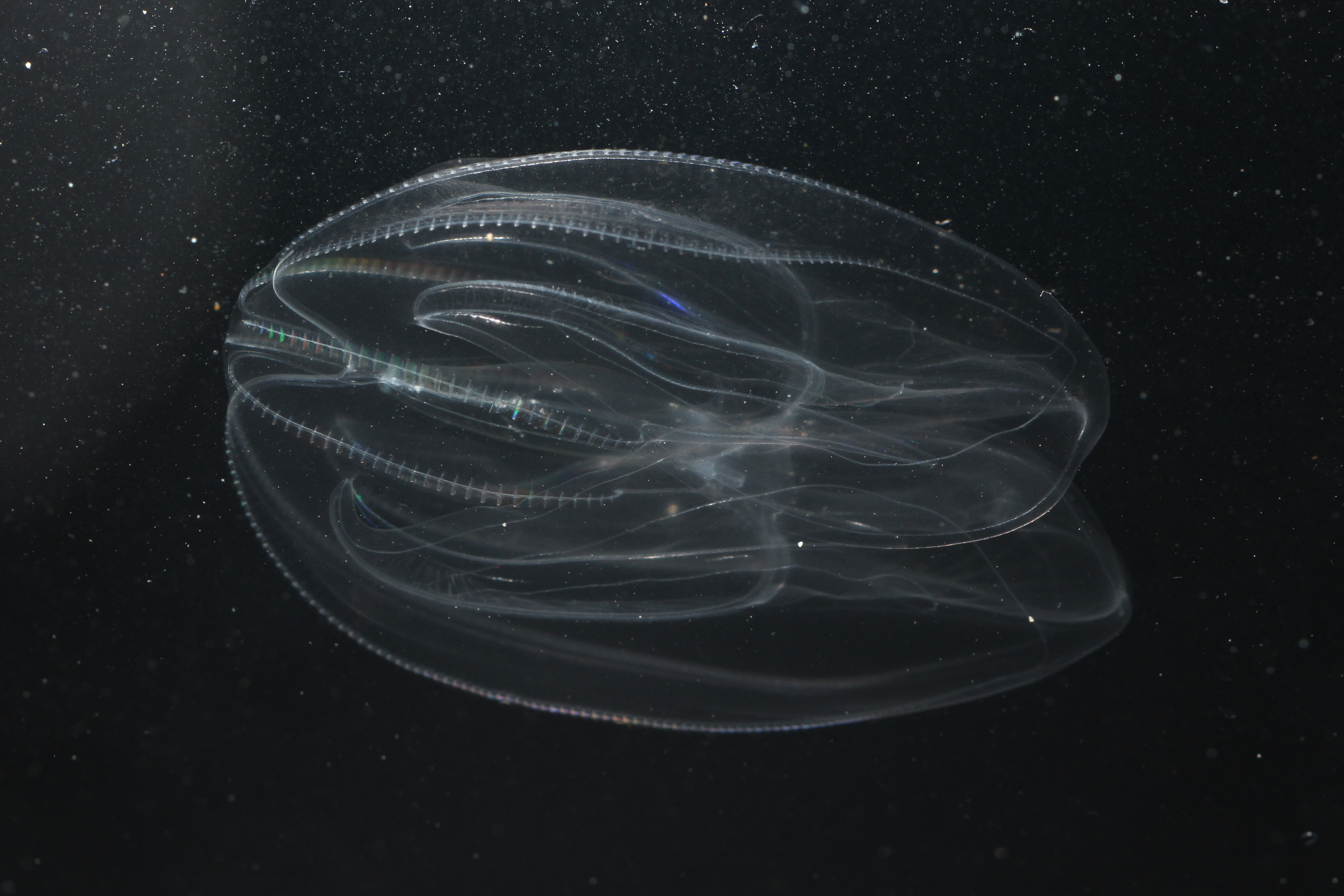
A ctenophore, a bathypelagic organism that bears a similar resemblance to the constellation fish particularly the luminous lines that run across its body. It is plausible that this was what Beebe saw on his voyage

Of the five new fish described by Beebe during the Bathysphere dives, none of them were confirmed to exist. His colleague Otis Barton, who descended with him in the submersible, attested he had also seen them.

Ichthyologist Carl Hubbs has proposed that the creature encountered by Beebe was not a fish at all, but rather a ctenophore, or "comb jelly". He proposed that the distortion caused by the small viewing window could have caused the comb jelly to appear narrower and cause its distinctive luminous lines to have been intensified.

== See also ==
- Abyssal rainbow gar
- Bathyceratias
- Bathyembryx
- Bathysphaera
