= Bathysphaera =

Cryptid deep-sea fish

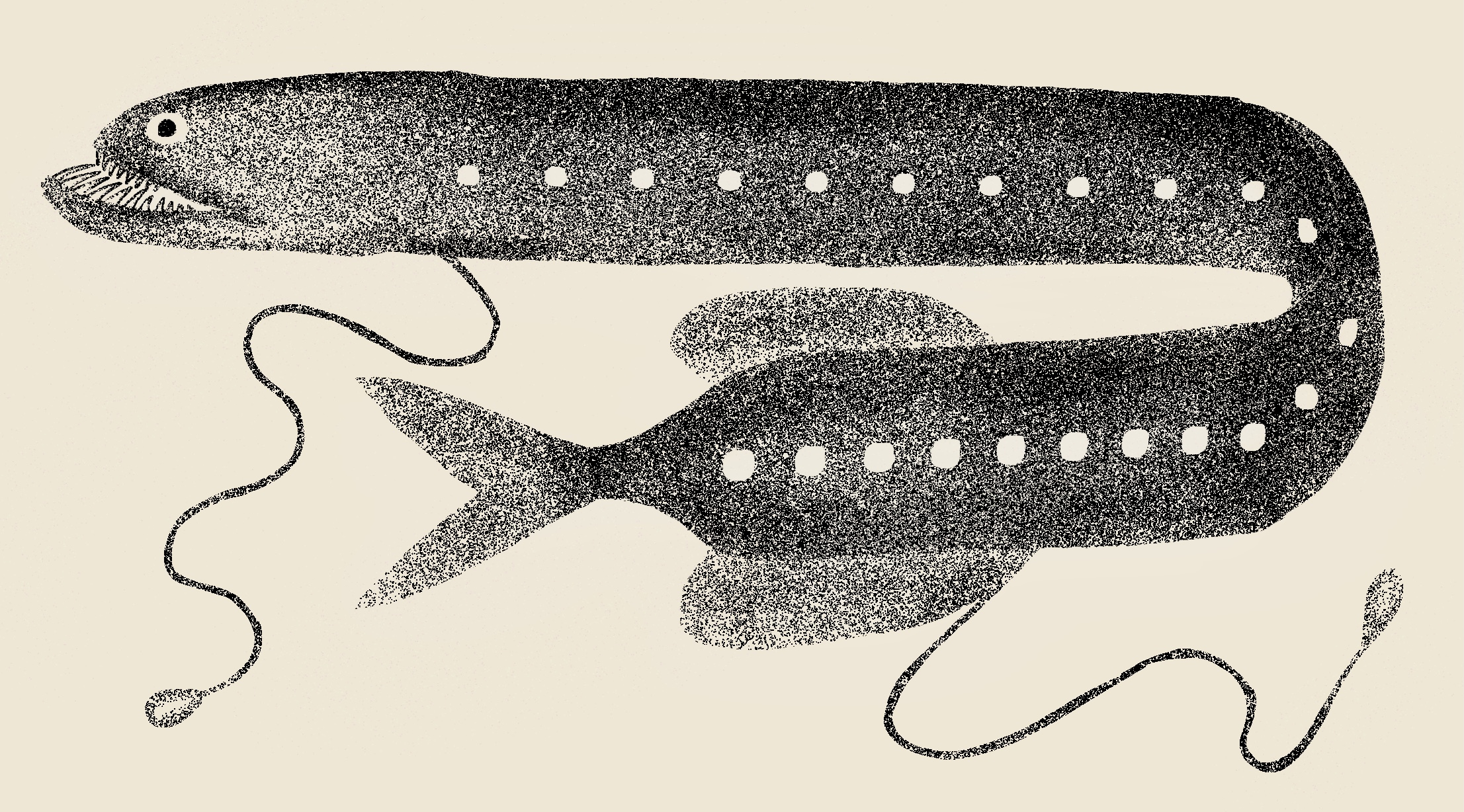
An illustration based on Else Bostelmann's reconstruction

Bathysphaera intacta, or the giant dragonfish, is a hypothetical species of fish described by William Beebe on 22 September 1932, having been spotted by the biologist as he descended to a depth of 640 metres (2100 feet) off the coast of Bermuda.

== Background ==
Beebe's bathysphere was a new yet primitive invention. It was a rounded steel enclosure with space for two people, its external layer being 3 centimetres thick. On the side, there was a single window fifteen centimetres across. It was fitted with a heavy steel door that had to be bolted on. With no maneuverability, navigation of the bathysphere was dependent on the ship it had been attached to. Beebe used this submersible in his deep-sea expeditions from 1930 to 1934.

== The encounter ==
"I saw it very clearly and knew it as something wholly different from any deep-sea fish which had yet been captured by man."

— William Beebe, Half Mile Down, page 172

Beebe encountered two fish, which he had described as "at least six feet long". He said they resembled barracudas, with short heads and jaws that were constantly opened, and that they were bioluminescent: "strong lights, pale bluish, were strung down the body". Beebe had brought no camera with him and instead described the species in detail to the artist Else Bostelmann, who illustrated his findings.

Beebe then expressed his justification for classifying them as dragonfish:

"Vertical fins well back were one of the characters which placed it among the sea-dragons, Melanostomiatids, and were clearly seen when the fish passed through the beam. There were two long tentacles, hanging down from the body, each tipped with a pair of separate, luminous bodies, the upper reddish, the lower one blue. These twitched and jerked along beneath the fish, one undoubtedly arising from the chin, and the other far back near the tail. I could see neither the stem of the tentacles nor any paired fins, although both were certainly present."

It was the first fish described by Beebe. In the name Bathysphaera intacta, "bathysphaera" refers to his submersible, and "intacta", in this context, means "untouchable".

== Status of existence ==
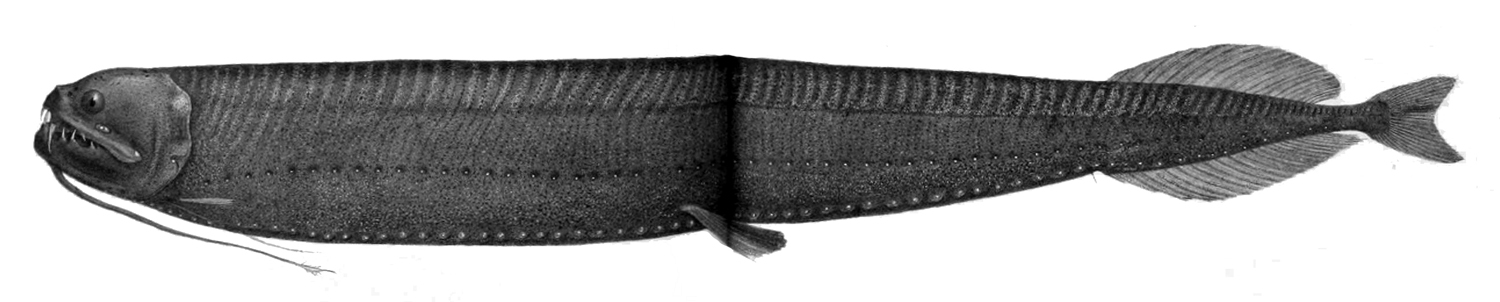
Opostomias micripnus, the largest dragonfish described

None of the five new fish described by Beebe were confirmed to exist, except by his colleague Otis Barton, who descended with him in the submersible. It is widely speculated that some of the fish species he stated to have discovered on his travels, the pallid sailfin and five-lined constellation fish, are misidentifications of squids and comb jellies respectively.

At the time, the largest dragonfish commonly attained lengths of 40 centimetres, a fact that Beebe acknowledges. He refers to the giant dragonfish as being "related to the scaleless black dragonfish (Melanostomias bartonbeani)".

Currently, the largest known dragonfish species is the obese dragonfish. It attains a maximum length of 55 centimetres, less than a third of the length of the fish Beebe saw.

== See also ==
- Abyssal rainbow gar
- Bathyceratias
- Bathyembryx
- Bathysidus
