= Titans of the Deep =

1938 film by Les Adams

Titans of the Deep is a 1938 film inspired by the early 1930s deep-sea dives made by William Beebe and Otis Barton using the Bathysphere. The movie is also attributed to William Beebe, but Beebe later stated that this was a misconception. Beebe and Barton were the first to set ocean depth records in a device invented by Barton.

The film was written by Les Adams. It was intended as a documentary but was often sold and advertised as an exploitation/horror picture.

== Premise ==
Prominent scientists Dr. William Beebe and Otis Barton, using the Bathysphere invented by Barton, descend several thousand feet to the ocean floor off the shores of Bermuda to study and film sea creatures seen and filmed at that depth for the first time.
