= Lee Crandall =

American ornithologist and General Curator of Bronx Zoo

- Born: January 26, 1887; Sherburne, New York
- Died: June 25, 1969 (aged 82)
- Education: University of Columbia
- Occupations: Ornithologist and zookeeper
- Employer: New York Zoological Society
- Spouse: Celia Mary Dowd

Lee Saunders Crandall (January 26, 1887 – June 25, 1969) was an American ornithologist and General Curator of Bronx Zoo. He worked at the Bronx Zoo from 1908 until his death in 1969.

== Biography ==
Born in Sherburne, New York, before moving to Utica aged four, Crandall began breeding and exhibiting Sebright and Cochin Bantams aged fifteen. His father and grandfather being doctors, it was assumed Crandall would follow in their footsteps, and he attended Cornell Medical School in 1907; however, he only stayed for one year before realizing he wanted a career with animals. A chance conversation with his class president, the nephew of the Treasurer of the New York Zoological Society (now the Wildlife Conservation Society), led to an interview with Director of the New York Zoological Park (now the Bronx Zoo), William T. Hornaday.

After this interview, Crandall became a student at the Park in June 1908, with rotating duties in the Mammal, Reptile and Bird departments. A meeting with William Beebe, who at that time was Bird Department Curator, in late summer 1908, saw Crandall become Beebe's assistant and a salaried keeper at the Zoo in the fall of 1908. This led Crandall to attend Columbia University, where he took a variety of zoology courses during 1908 and 1909, returning to full-time work at the Zoo in 1909.

Crandall was appointed assistant curator of birds in 1911 and became curator of the Bird Department in 1919, when Beebe began to devote his time fully to his Department of Tropical Research work. Crandall remained in this role until 1943, when he became general curator, a role in which he remained until his retirement in 1952. After his retirement, he continued to work in the zoo's offices at least five days a week and served as curator emeritus until his death in 1969.

Crandall was highly respected within the field of zoological park management and the maintenance of wild animals in captivity.

== Field Work ==
1909: Collecting trip to British Guiana with William Beebe, from which he returned with 300 birds of 50 species for the Bronx Zoo.

1912: Returned from a trip to numerous European zoos and animal dealers with a large collection of exhibition specimens.

1914: Expedition to Costa Rica, assisted by T. Donald Carter. After six weeks in the field they returned with 300 living mammals, birds, reptiles, amphibians, fishes, and insects.

1928: Crandall's biggest expedition was to the interior of New Guinea to collect birds of paradise for the Zoo. Crandall left New York on August 9, 1928, and returned on March 21, 1929, with 40 birds of paradise and around 200 other birds and several mammals. He was able to penetrate the Owen Stanley Mountain Range and secured nine species of birds of paradise. He was accompanied by John E. Ward, an Australian field naturalist, and a team of native bearers. On the return voyage, his ship was wrecked on a coral reef between Port Moresby and Sydney. Crandall and his team rode out a storm for six days before they were rescued, and he arrived back in New York after a 44-day voyage, having not lost a single specimen. His collection of birds of paradise was one of the best collections ever to have left New Guinea, and they became the focus of an important series of papers by Crandall, which were mostly published in Zoologica. In 1930 Scribner's published his account of the expedition, entitled Paradise Quest.

== Publications ==
Crandall wrote extensively throughout his career, the result of which is over 250 articles and four books.

His very first publication Wild birds bred in captivity in the United States (New York Zool. Soc. Bull. 2: 580–583, 1909) defined his interests and demonstrates the contributions Crandall made to the subject of understanding the management of captive wild animals.

=== Books by Crandall ===
- Pets: Their History and Care (1917)
- Paradise Quest (1931)
- The Management of Wild Mammals in Captivity (1964)
- A Zoo Man's Notebook (1966; with William Bridges)

Crandall's most significant publication was The Management of Wild Animals in Captivity, after which he became known as "dean of American zoo men," such was its impact. Work began on it directly after his retirement in 1952, and when it was published in 1964, it immediately became known in the zoo world as "the zoo man's bible". The publication was the culmination of fifty years of observation on the feeding, housing, reproduction and longevity of the animals at the Bronx Zoo, with references also drawn from zoos around the world.

== Memberships, professional affiliations and other activities ==
- 1909: Became member of American Ornithologists' Union.
- 1930: Elected to membership of American Ornithologists' Union.
- 1951: Elected fellow of American Ornithologists' Union.

At the time of his death, Crandall was Secretary-Treasurer of the American Committee for International Wildlife Protection, a position which entailed coordination of American participation in world-wide conservation activities, a fellow of the New York Zoological Society and the New York Academy of Sciences. He was a corresponding member of the Zoological Society of London, an honorary member of the Zoological Society of San Diego, the American Institute of Park Executives, the International Union of Directors of Zoological Gardens and the Avicultural Society.

For many years, Crandall served as Inspector for the Fish and Wildlife Service of the United States Government.

Crandall was awarded the Everly Gold Medal of the American Association of Zoological Parks and Aquariums in 1965.

== Personal life ==
In 1910, Crandall married Celia Mary Dowd. They had one daughter together, Sylvia. Crandall's hobbies included bridge, stamp collecting, gardening, and golf.
