= Bathysphere =

Unpowered spherical deep-sea observation submersible lowered on a cable

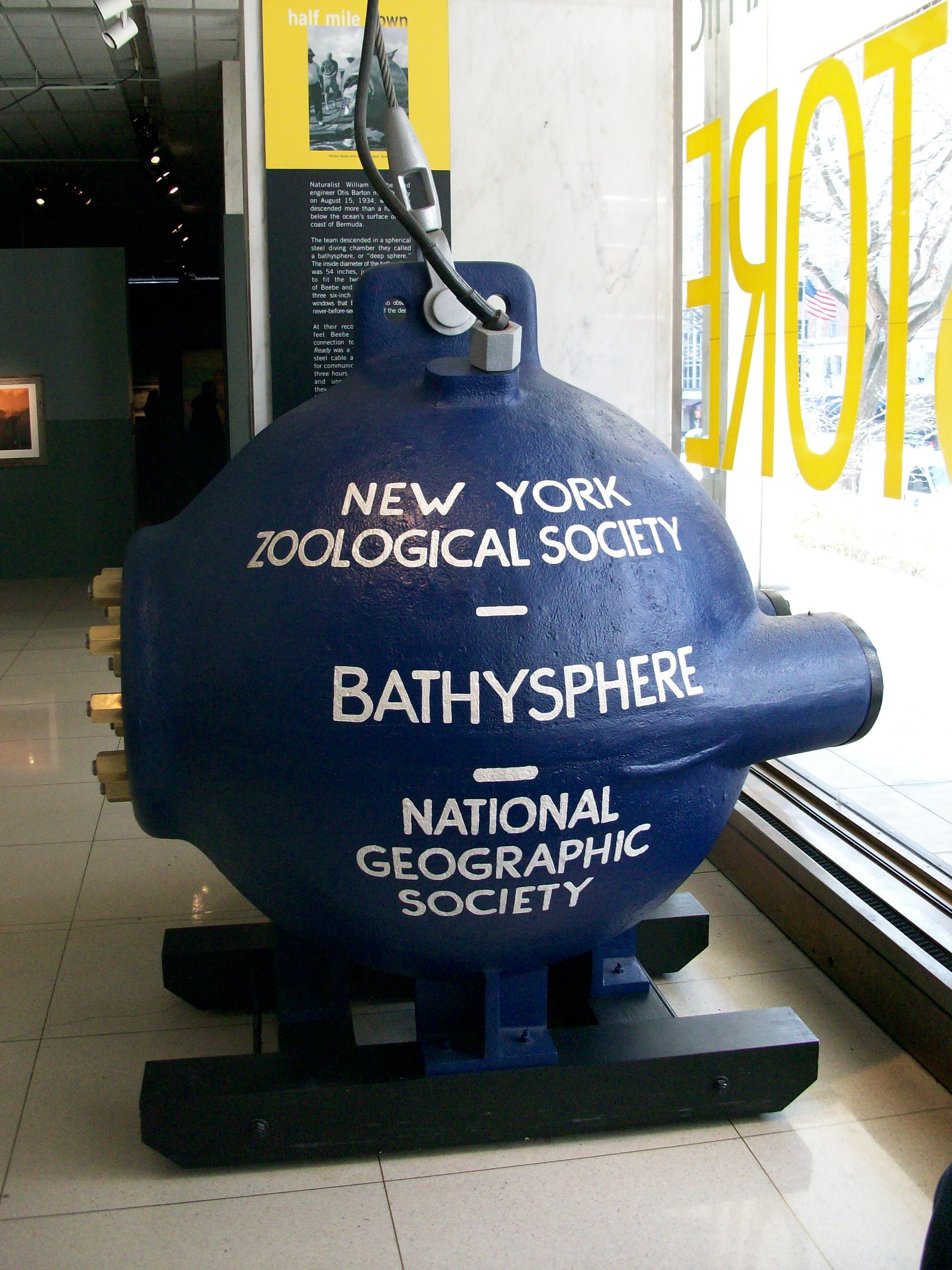
The Bathysphere on display at the National Geographic museum in 2009

The Bathysphere (from Ancient Greek βαθύς (bathús) 'deep' and σφαῖρα (sphaîra) 'sphere') was a unique spherical deep-sea submersible which was unpowered and lowered into the ocean on a cable, and was used to conduct a series of dives off the coast of Bermuda from 1930 to 1934. The Bathysphere was designed in 1928 and 1929 by the American engineer Otis Barton, to be used by the naturalist William Beebe for studying undersea wildlife. Beebe and Barton conducted dives in the Bathysphere together, marking the first time that a marine biologist observed deep-sea animals in their native environment. Their dives set several consecutive world records for the deepest dive ever performed by a human. The record set by the deepest of these, to a depth of 3,028 ft (923 m) on August 15, 1934, lasted until it was broken by Barton in 1949 in a vessel called Benthoscope.

== Origin and design ==
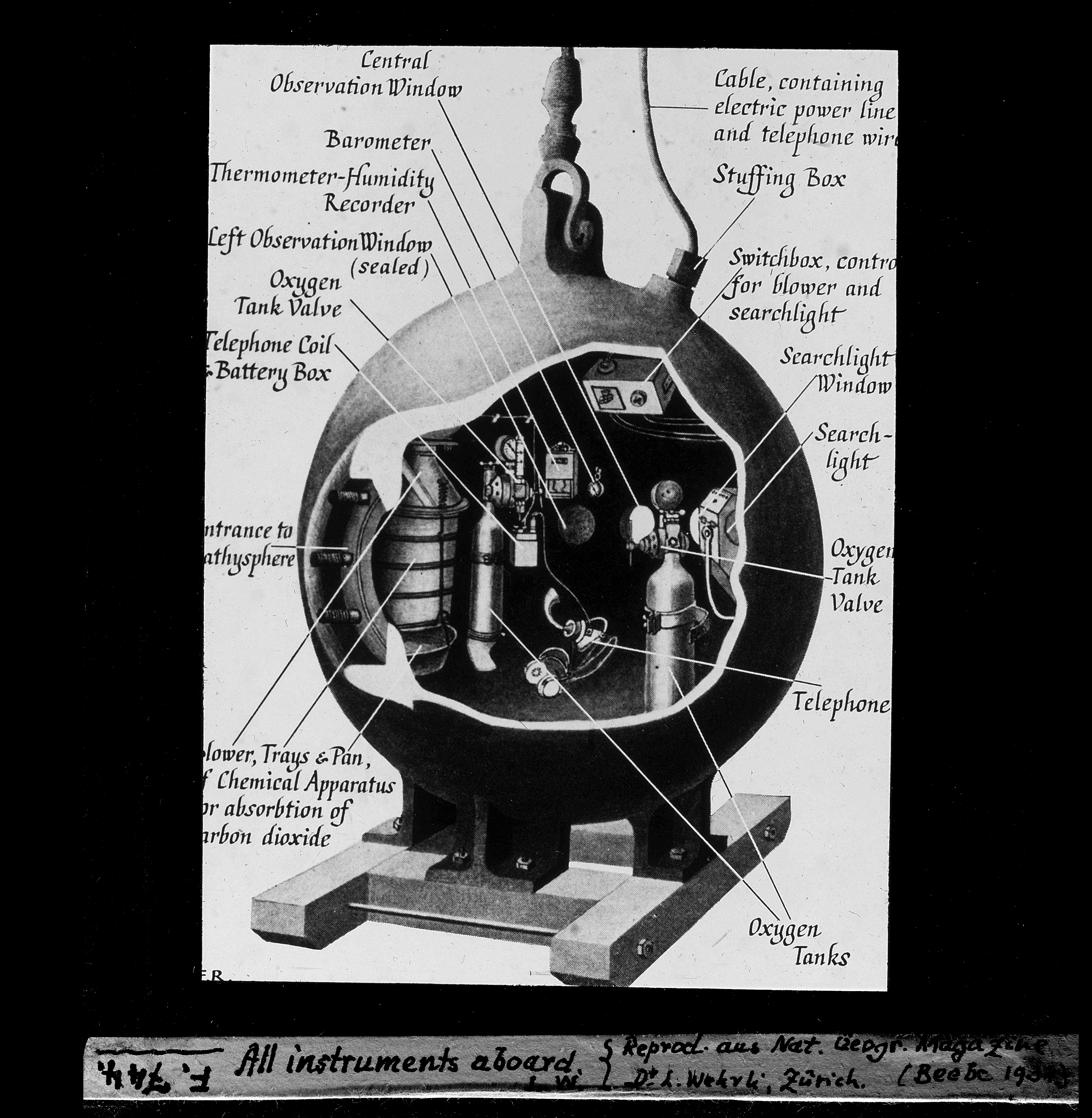
The instruments aboard the Bathysphere

In 1928, the American naturalist William Beebe was given permission by the British government to establish a research station on Nonsuch Island, Bermuda. Using this station, Beebe planned to conduct an in-depth study of the animals inhabiting an eight-square-mile (21 km^{2}) area of ocean, from a depth of two miles (3.2 km) to the surface. Although his initial plan called for him to conduct this study by means of helmet diving and dredging, Beebe soon realized that these methods were inadequate for gaining a detailed understanding of deep-sea animals, and began making plans to invent a way to observe them in their native habitat.

As of the late 1920s, the deepest humans could safely descend in diving helmets was several hundred feet. Submarines of the time had descended to a maximum of 383 ft (117 m), but had no windows, making them useless for Beebe's goal of observing deep-sea animals. The deepest in the ocean that any human had descended at this point was 525 ft (160 m) wearing an armored suit, but these suits also made movement and observation extremely difficult. What Beebe hoped to create was a deep-sea vessel which both could descend to a much greater depth than any human had descended thus far, and also would enable him to clearly observe and document the deep ocean's wildlife.

Beebe's initial design called for a cylindrical vessel, and articles describing his plans were published in The New York Times. These articles caught the attention of the engineer Otis Barton, who had his own ambition to become a deep-sea explorer. Barton was certain that a cylinder would not be strong enough to withstand the pressure of the depths to which Beebe was planning to descend, and sent Beebe several letters proposing an alternative design to him. So many unqualified opportunists were attempting to join Beebe in his efforts that Beebe tended to ignore most of his mail, and Barton's first efforts to contact him were fruitless. A mutual friend of Barton's and Beebe's eventually arranged a meeting between the two, enabling Barton to present his design to Beebe in person. Beebe approved of Barton's design, and the two of them made a deal: Barton would pay for the vessel and all of the other equipment to go with it, while Beebe would pay for other expenses such as chartering a ship to raise and lower it, and as the owner of the vessel Barton would accompany Beebe on his dives in it.

Barton's design called for a spherical vessel, as a sphere is the best possible shape for resisting high pressure. The sphere had openings for three 3-inch-thick (76 mm) windows made of fused quartz, the strongest transparent material then available, as well as a 400-pound (180 kg) entrance hatch which was to be bolted down before a descent. Initially only two of the windows were mounted on the sphere, and a steel plug was mounted in place of the third window. Oxygen was supplied from high-pressure cylinders carried inside the sphere, while pans of soda lime and calcium chloride were mounted inside the sphere's walls to absorb exhaled CO_{2} and moisture. Air was to be circulated past these trays by the Bathysphere's occupants using palm-leaf fans. The design was originally called a "tank," "bell," or "sphere". Beebe coined the name "bathysphere" using the prefix of the genus Bathytroctes.

The casting of the steel sphere was handled by Watson Stillman Hydraulic Machinery Company in Roselle, New Jersey, and the cord to raise and lower the sphere was provided by John A. Roebling's Sons Company. General Electric provided a lamp which would be mounted just inside one of the windows to illuminate animals outside the sphere, and Bell Laboratories provided a telephone system by which divers inside the sphere could communicate with the surface. The cables for the telephone and to provide electricity for the lamp were sealed inside a rubber hose, which entered the body of the Bathysphere through a stuffing box.

After the initial version of the sphere had been cast in June 1929, it was discovered that it was too heavy to be lifted by the winch which would be used to lower it into the ocean, requiring Barton to have the sphere melted and re-cast. The final, lighter design consisted of a hollow sphere of one-inch-thick (25 mm) cast steel which was 4.75 ft (1.45 m) in diameter. Its weight was 2.25 tons above the water, although its buoyancy reduced this by 1.4 tons when it was submerged, and the 3,000 ft (910 m) of steel cable weighed an additional 1.35 tons.

== History of use ==
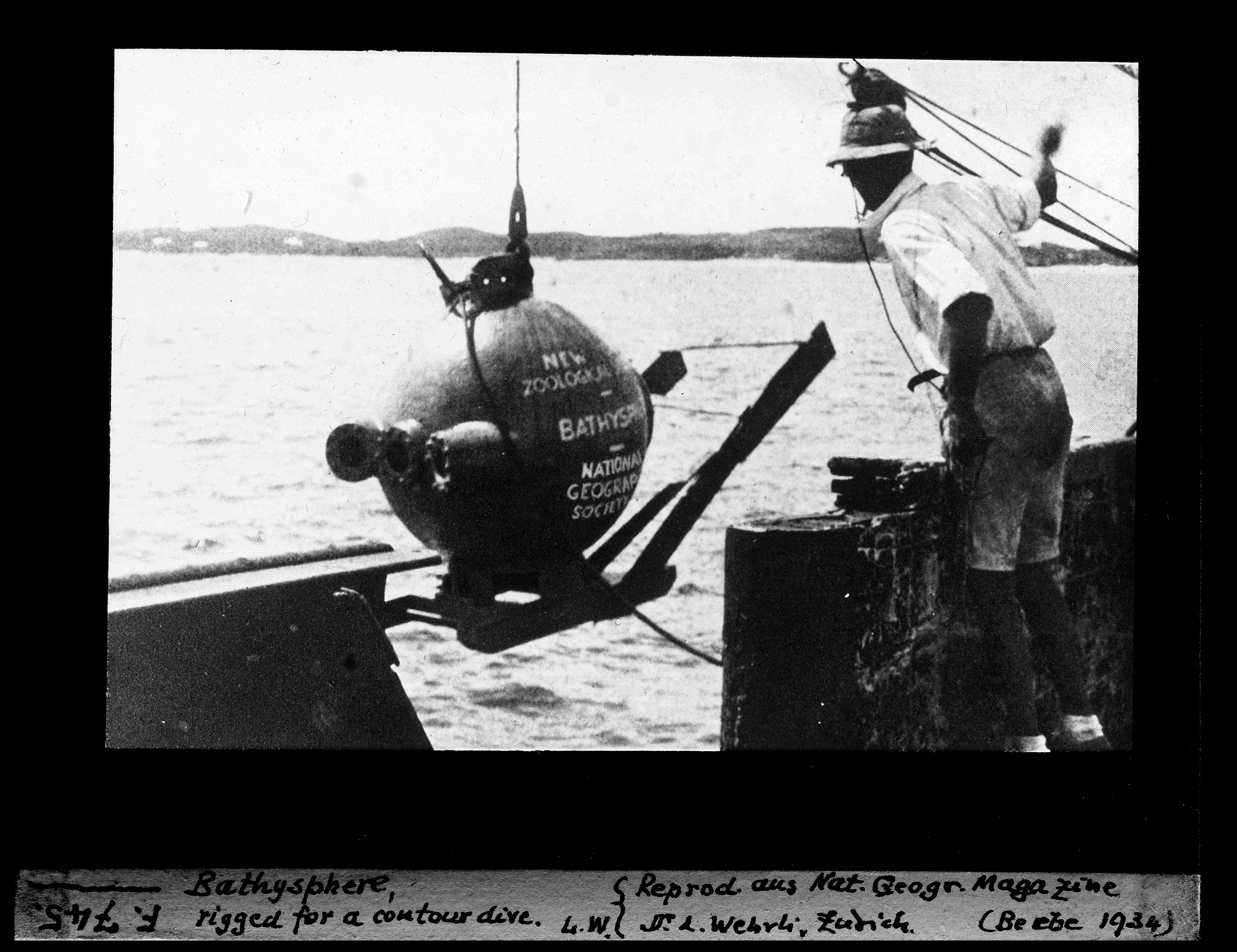
Bathysphere rigged for diving

The Bathysphere's first dives were conducted from the deck of a former British Naval ship called the Ready, which was towed by a tugboat called the Gladisfen. The winch used to raise and lower the sphere had been salvaged from a third ship, the Arcturus, on which Beebe had led two previous expeditions. One of Beebe's assistants, John Tee-Van, was in charge of operations aboard the two ships, while another, Gloria Hollister, had the duty of communicating with the two divers via the telephone line and taking notes of whatever observations they communicated to her.

=== 1930–1931 ===
Beebe and Barton conducted their first test of the sphere on May 27, 1930, descending to the relatively shallow depth of 45 ft (14 m) in order to ensure that everything worked properly. For a second test, they sent the Bathysphere down unmanned to a far greater depth, and found after pulling it up that the rubber hose carrying the electrical and phone cables had become twisted forty-five times around the cable suspending the Bathysphere. After a second unmanned test dive on June 6 in which the cord did not become tangled, Beebe and Barton performed their first deep dive in the Bathysphere, reaching a depth of 803 ft (245 m).

Beebe and Barton conducted several successful dives during the summer months of 1930, documenting deep-sea animals which had never before been seen in their native habitats. During these dives, Beebe became the first person to observe how as one descends into the depths of the ocean, some frequencies of sunlight disappear before others, so that below a certain depth the only colors of light that remain are violet and blue. Beebe and Barton also used the Bathysphere to perform shallower "contour dives", mapping Bermuda's underwater geography. These were particularly dangerous due to the possibility of the Bathysphere smashing against the underwater cliffs which Beebe was mapping, and Barton installed a rudder on the Bathysphere in order to better control its motion during these dives. On June 16, in honor of Hollister's 30th birthday, Beebe allowed her and Tee-Van to perform a dive in the Bathysphere to a depth of 410 ft (120 m), setting a world record for a dive by a woman. Hollister and Tee-Van pleaded to be allowed to descend deeper than this, but Beebe did not allow it out of fear for their safety. In the fall of 1930 Barton donated the Bathysphere to the New York Zoological Society, the primary organization behind Beebe's work.

Beebe attempted to continue his dives in summer of 1931, but was foiled by technical problems and by the weather. The Arcturus winch developed a crack in it, a replacement for it did not arrive until the end of July, and by that time Bermuda was being plagued by storms which made the water too rough for dives to be conducted safely. The onset of the Great Depression also made it more difficult to obtain funding, and in an effort to raise money for continued dives Beebe promised to eventually descend 0.5 mi (0.80 km). He also obtained more funds for his dives by writing an article describing them for the June 1931 issue of National Geographic titled "Round Trip to Davy Jones' Locker". Illustrations for the article were painted by Else Bostelmann, a wildlife artist who frequently illustrated the animals that Beebe observed during his dives.

=== 1932 ===
Beebe and Barton resumed their dives in 1932, this time launching the Bathysphere from a single ship called the Freedom instead of the Ready and the Gladisfen. They had arranged a plan with NBC whereby their observations relayed up the phone line would be broadcast nationally over the radio. Barton also hoped to film deep-sea creatures from inside the Bathysphere. Beebe normally observed the depths through one of the Bathysphere's three windows since the searchlight was shone through the second, and a steel plug had been in place of the third, but this was changed when Barton had the steel plug replaced with a third window in order to film through it. When conducting an unmanned test of the Bathysphere with the third window installed, they found it almost entirely full of water. Realizing the immense pressure that the Bathysphere must be under, Beebe ordered his crew to stand clear and began loosening the hatch's bolts to remove the hatch himself. Beebe described the experience that followed this in his book Half Mile Down:

Suddenly, without the slightest warning, the bolt was torn from our hands, and the mass of heavy metal shot across the deck like the shell from a gun. The trajectory was almost straight, and the brass bolt hurtled into the steel winch thirty feet [9.1 m] away across the deck and sheared a half-inch [13 mm] notch gouged out by the harder metal. This was followed by a solid cylinder of water, which slackened after a while into a cataract, pouring out the hole in the door, some air mingled with the water, looking like hot steam, instead of compressed air shooting through ice-cold water.

After replacing the third window with the steel plug and conducting another unmanned test, the same problem happened again. Beebe later described what would have happened to him and Barton had they been inside the sphere on a dive during which it leaked. They would not have had time to drown: due to the immense pressure, "the first few drops of water would have shot through flesh and bone like steel bullets."

After packing the plug in more securely, and sending the Bathysphere down for another test dive in which the plug held, Beebe and Barton set off for their radio dive on September 22. The first part of the radio broadcast was conducted from on board the Freedom, describing Beebe and Barton preparing for their dive, while the second part would be relayed up the phone line from the sphere as Beebe and Barton descended in it. The ocean during this dive was rougher than it had been during any of their previous dives, and as the Freedom rocked on the surface, its motion was transmitted down the steel cable, causing the Bathysphere to swing from side to side like a pendulum. As the Bathysphere descended, Barton succumbed to seasickness and vomited inside it. However, the first half of the radio transmission had already been broadcast, and neither Beebe nor Barton wished to cancel its second half, so they continued their descent.

Beebe and Barton began the second half of their radio broadcast at a depth of 1,550 feet (470 m). Beebe's observations were broadcast over the radio as he gradually descended to a depth of 2,200 feet (670 m). Beebe encountered the Bathysphaera, according to him "wholly different from any deep-sea fish". With the broadcast finished, although they were only 440 feet (130 m) short of their promised goal of 0.5 miles (2,600 ft; 800 m), the Bathysphere was still rocking wildly and Beebe and Barton were both bruised and bleeding from being knocked about inside it. Shortly after the end of the radio broadcast, Beebe gave the order for them to be pulled back up.

Beebe and Barton conducted several more dives in 1932, including both dives to document deep-sea animals and the shallower contour dives. Although the Bathysphere's third window still was not installed, Beebe periodically shared his window with Barton so that Barton could film through it.

=== 1933–1934 ===
In 1933, the Bathysphere was displayed in a special exhibit for the American Museum of Natural History, and at the Century of Progress World's Fair in Chicago. Beebe shared the fair's Hall of Science with Auguste Piccard, who held the world record for altitude for his ascent into the stratosphere in a hot-air balloon, and the publicity Beebe received for this exposition was even greater than what he had received in his radio dive. Meanwhile, Barton was busy filming more footage for an underwater movie which he hoped to make. Due to the combination of these factors and the Depression, Beebe and Barton did not conduct any dives in 1933.

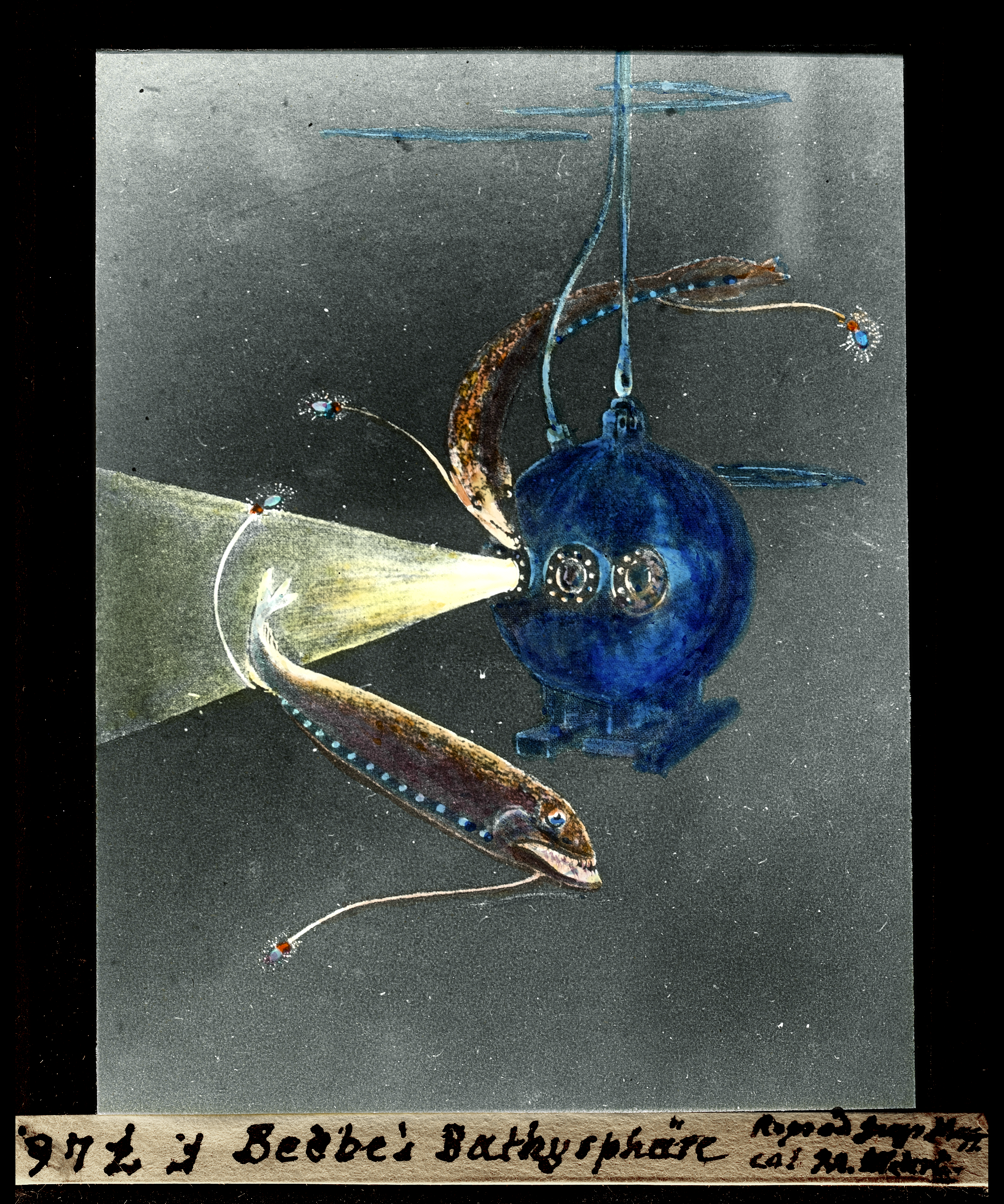
Else Bostelmann's illustration of the Bathysphere's descent, painted for the National Geographic article which Beebe wrote in return for the National Geographic Society sponsoring his dives

Beebe's meeting with Piccard gave him an idea about how to obtain funding for additional dives. Piccard's flights had been funded by the National Geographic Society, in return for Piccard having written an article describing them for National Geographic. Thinking that the society might feel similarly about descents into the ocean to how they did about ascents into the sky, Beebe wrote a letter to Gilbert Hovey Grosvenor proposing a similar sponsorship for his Bathysphere dives. Grosvenor wrote back offering to provide $10,000 (equivalent to $250,000 today) for additional dives in return for Beebe keeping his promise to descend a half mile, and writing two articles for National Geographic describing the experience. Despite his reluctance over Grosvenor's terms, Beebe accepted this offer.

Examining the Bathysphere in preparation for resumed dives, Beebe found that it was in need of considerable repair. The steel body of the Bathysphere was as strong as ever, but the quartz windows had developed minute fractures which would prevent them from withstanding the pressure of the deep sea, and one of the copper bolts for the hatch was found to be damaged due to the explosive decompression after the failed test dive in 1932. In addition to replacing these parts of the Bathysphere, Beebe also had it installed with a new system of valves which could regulate the release of oxygen much more precisely than before, and a barometer to show the increase in pressure if oxygen was flowing too quickly. The palm-leaf fans to circulate air past the chemical trays were replaced with a small electric fan, powered by the same cable that powered the searchlight, and the searchlight itself was replaced with a far more powerful one.

With the renovated Bathysphere, Beebe and Barton began preparing for their planned descent of half a mile. Their ship once again was the Ready, this time towed by a tug called the Powerful. During their first test dive, they demanded to be pulled up after descending only four feet (1.2 m) because the sphere had begun to leak; they soon discovered this was because Tee-Van had neglected to fasten all of the bolts that hold the hatch shut. Another problem occurred on their second test dive, during which they discovered that the lower end of the rubber hose holding the power cable and phone line had begun to deteriorate, and they spent the rest of the day reversing the hose's direction so that the end which was deteriorating would be the end above the water. For a third test dive, they sent down the Bathysphere unoccupied but with Barton's camera, which had not yet captured any footage of deep-sea animals, pointed at the center window. Most of the footage from Barton's camera was unintelligible, but it captured one image of a deep-sea fish, and more importantly it came up dry.

On August 11, 1934, Beebe and Barton made a descent of 2,510 feet (770 m), setting a new world record. Beebe used this dive as an opportunity to test the predictions made by quantum mechanics that different colors of light would behave differently due to their varying wavelengths. Beebe carried a painted spectroscope to measure the rate at which the various colors of light vanished as he descended. This dive was also Beebe's most successful yet in terms of the variety of fish he encountered, some of which were new to science, like Bathyembryx and Bathysidus. Although he halted this descent only 140 feet (43 m) short of their goal of half a mile, Beebe later explained that he considered the observations he made from the Bathysphere to be more important than the depth records that he set.

On August 15, 1934, Barton and Beebe descended to 3,028 feet (923 m), fulfilling their promise to descend half a mile. At this depth the entire cable was unwound from the winch used to raise and lower the sphere, preventing it from being lowered any deeper. Although Beebe wished to remain at that depth to observe for half an hour, the Ready's captain would not allow this and pulled them up after five minutes. The record set during this dive remained unbroken until 1949, when Barton broke it with a 4,500-foot (1,400 m) descent in a new deep-sea vessel he created called the Benthoscope.

Beebe and Barton conducted several more shallower dives during the rest of the 1934 season. Later on the same day as the half-mile dive, Barton and Hollister descended to 1,208 feet (368 m), setting a new world record for a woman diver that would stand for three decades. The Bathysphere's final dive was performed by Beebe and Barton on August 27, to a depth of 1,503 feet (458 m).

Although Beebe had initially agreed to write two articles for National Geographic in exchange for the National Geographic Society's sponsorship, after he had written the first of the two he and the magazine's editor agreed that it was not interesting enough to be a stand-alone story, and that it would be better to combine the two into a single article. Beebe's account of his record-setting dive was published in the December 1934 issue of National Geographic, along with sixteen of Bostelmann's paintings, under the title "A Half Mile Down: Strange Creatures Beautiful and Grotesque as Figments of Fancy, Reveal Themselves at Windows of Bathysphere". The text of this article also became the climactic chapter of Beebe's book Half Mile Down, which appeared in bookstores in time for Christmas of that year and was an immediate best-seller.

=== After 1934 ===
Beebe continued to conduct marine research for the rest of the 1930s, but after 1934 he felt that he had seen what he wanted to see using the Bathysphere, and that further dives were too expensive for whatever knowledge he gained from them to be worth the cost. With the onset of World War II, Bermuda was transformed into a military base, destroying much of the natural environment and making further research there impractical.

After Beebe stopped using the Bathysphere, it remained the property of the New York Zoological Society. It remained in storage until the 1939 New York World's Fair, where it was the centerpiece of the society's exhibit. During World War II, the sphere was loaned to the United States Navy, which used it to test the effects of underwater explosions. The Bathysphere was next put on display at the New York Aquarium in Coney Island in 1957. In 1994, the Bathysphere was removed from the Aquarium for a renovation, and languished in a storage yard under the Coney Island Cyclone until 2005, when the Zoological Society (now known as the Wildlife Conservation Society) returned it to its display at the aquarium. The Bermuda Aquarium, Museum and Zoo (to which Beebe had given some of Bostlemann's original drawings) has long displayed a copy of the bathysphere, and another reproduction is on display at the National Geographic Museum.

== Legacy of dives ==
Although the technology of the Bathysphere was eventually rendered obsolete by more advanced diving vessels, Beebe and Barton's Bathysphere represented the first time that researchers attempted to observe deep-sea animals in their native environment, setting a precedent which many others would follow. Beebe's Bathysphere's dives also served as an inspiration for Jacques Piccard, the son of the balloonist Auguste Piccard, to perform his own record-setting descent in 1960 to a depth of seven miles (11 km) using a self-powered submersible called a bathyscaphe. The Bathysphere itself served as a model for later submersibles such as the DSV Alvin.

Beebe named several new species of deep-sea animals on the basis of observations he made during his Bathysphere dives, initiating a controversy which has never been completely resolved. The naming of a new species ordinarily requires obtaining and analyzing a type specimen, something which was obviously impossible from inside the Bathysphere. Some of Beebe's critics claimed that these fish were illusions resulting from condensation on the Bathysphere's window, or even that Beebe willfully made them up, although the latter would have been strongly at odds with Beebe's reputation as an honest and rigorous scientist. Barton, who was resentful that newspaper articles about his and Beebe's Bathysphere dives often failed to mention him, added to ichthyologists' skepticism by writing letters to newspapers that contained wildly inaccurate accounts of their observations. While many of Beebe's observations from the Bathysphere have since been confirmed by advances in undersea photography, it is unclear whether others fit the description of any known sea animal. One possibility is that although the animals described by Beebe indeed exist, so much remains to be discovered about life in the deep ocean that these animals have yet to be seen by anyone other than him.

== In popular culture ==
=== Titans of the Deep ===
Barton's undersea movie was released in 1938 under the title Titans of the Deep, and prominently featured the Bathysphere. The movie was not well received. Although William Beebe's name appeared in the movie's credits, he emphatically denied any part in its production, stating that it was entirely Barton's work.

=== Other appearances ===
In the Stephen Sondheim ballad "I'm Still Here" from Follies chronicling intra-war American pop culture, the aging movie star Carlotta sings that "Beebe's Bathysphere" gave her heebie-jeebies.

Although the term "Bathysphere" originally referred specifically to the vessel used by Beebe and Barton, more recently movies and video games have begun to use the term "bathysphere" for any spherical deep-sea vessel lowered on a cord.

- In the movie Warlords of Atlantis, a vessel called a bathysphere is the means of transportation for the characters in and out of the Atlantis.
- In the video game BioShock, a bathysphere is the means of transportation to and around the undersea city of Rapture.
- In the video game Psychonauts, a vessel called a bathysphere is used for transport to an area at the bottom of the camp's lake.
- In the episode "Twenty Years to Midnight" of the animated television series The Venture Bros., Action Johnny is found living in a bathysphere, feeding his addiction to heroin and other narcotics.

== See also ==
- Timeline of diving technology – Chronological list of notable events in the history of underwater diving equipment
- Diving chamber – Hyperbaric pressure vessel for human occupancy used in diving operations
- Diving bell – Chamber for transporting divers vertically through the water
- Bathyscaphe – Free-diving self-propelled deep-sea submersible
- Deepsea Challenger – Submersible that traveled to the Challenger Deep

== Bibliography ==
- Descent: The Heroic Discovery of the Abyss by Bradford Matsen. (Vintage: 2006).
