= Else Bostelmann =

German-born American artist (1882–1961)

Else Winkler von Röder (Roeder) Bostelmann (1882 – December 1961) was a German-born American artist. She joined the New York Zoological Society (now the Wildlife Conservation Society) in 1929 to paint marine life during William Beebe's bathysphere oceanographic expeditions at Bermuda's Island (1930–1934).

Bostelmann's marine life paintings depicted the unbelievable sights that Beebe encountered from great depths in the ocean. "Had it not been for Mrs. Bostelmann's deftness in rapidly sketching what she saw, much of the color and drama would have been lost."

== Biography ==
Bostelmann, born in Leipzig, German Empire, attended private schools and spent her childhood in the German Empire and Austria-Hungary. Prior to her marriage in 1909 to Monroe Bostelmann (1881–1920), she studied at the University of Leipzig and the Grand Ducal Academy in Weimar, receiving a Gold Medal for drawing. In addition to the Königliche Akademie of Graphic Arts in Leipzig, Bostelmann studied with the well-known Russian artist Sascha Schneider (1870–1927) and German painter Ludwig von Hofmann (1861–1945). In America, she was a student of artists Howard Giles (1876–1955) and Bernard Klonis (1906–1957).

Bostelmann had her first solo exhibition in Leipzig, Germany, at the age of 27. In America, she soloed at the Argent Gallery, New York, and the Biltmore Art Gallery in Palm Beach, Florida. She also exhibited in Salons of America, 1934, in New York; Pen and Brush, 1953 and 1954, where she won awards including first place; American Artists Professional League (AAPL), 1951; NAC, 1952; National Geographic Society; Bermuda National Gallery; Wildlife Conservation Society's New York Aquarium (2014) on Coney Island. She was a member of the Society of Woman Geographers and of Pen and Brush. In 1949, her National Geographic painting of Mexican Aztecs was used by the Belgian cartoonist Hergé in his 1949 Tintin magazine story "Prisoners of the Sun".

After her marriage in Germany (1909), Bostelmann immigrated to America. According to a statement she gave to the Darien Review in 1955, she discontinued painting for ten years to do research on natural history, "a choice which paved her way to the things she has done during the forty years she has been in the United States."

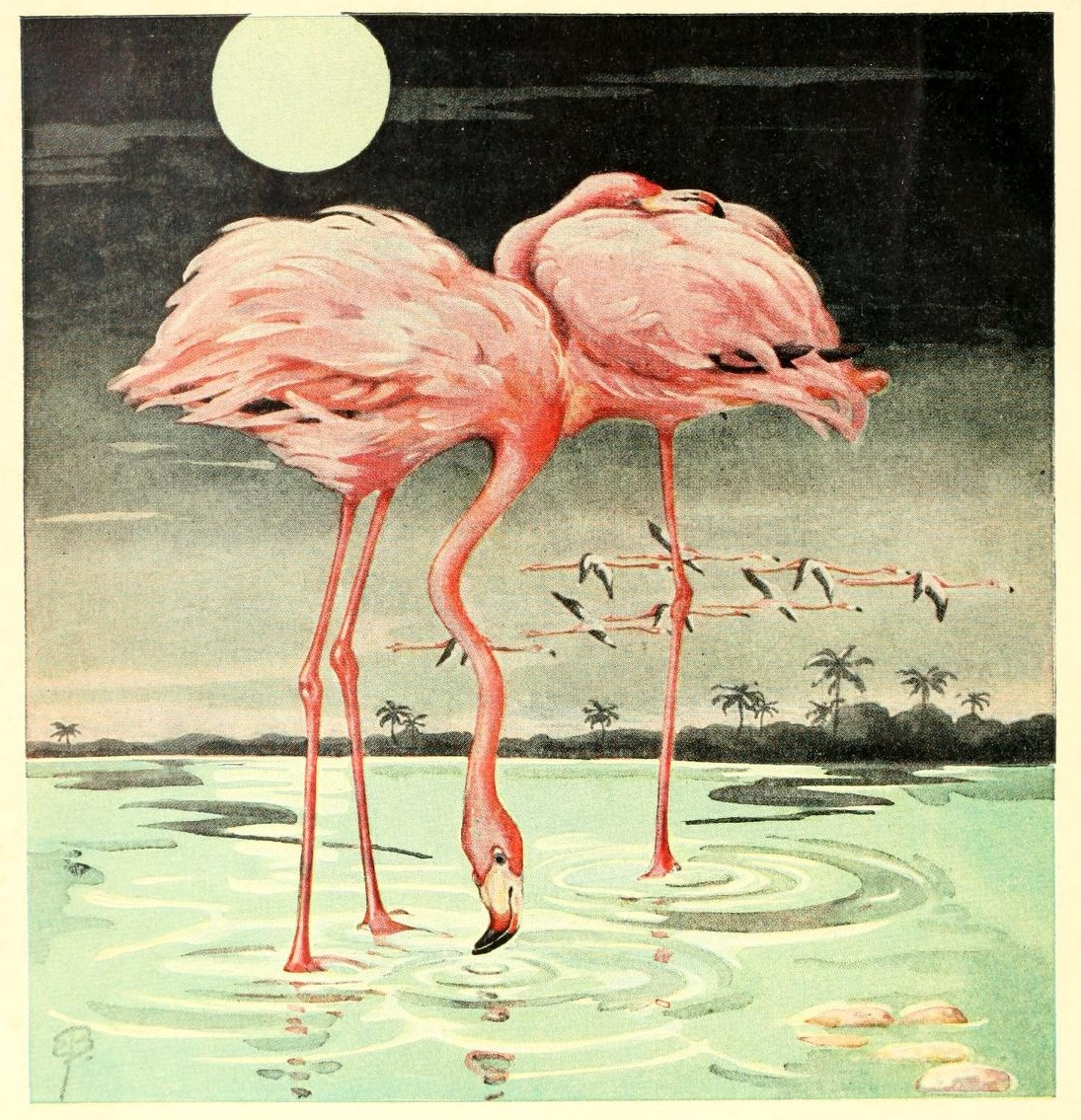
Textbook illustration of flamingos by Bostelmann

In 1910, the newlyweds moved to Mexia, Texas, where Mr. Bostelmann desired to become a cotton grower. Their daughter, Gertraud Hadumodt Bostelmann (Crumpton), was born the following year. Life proved to be very difficult for them. In 1920, Mr. Bostelmann was found alongside a Mexia road, dying from exhaustion. After his death, Else and Gertraud returned to New York, possibly staying with her sister-in-law Celeste (Monroe's sister) and her husband Truman Fassett, also an artist. She supported herself and Gertraud as a freelance merchandise illustrator and as an illustrator for sheet music covers.

During the 1920s, Bostelmann illustrated marine invertebrates for the Vanderbilt Marine Museum. In 1929, she contacted the New York Zoological Society at the Bronx Zoo and was hired to be the expedition artist for William Beebe in Bermuda. This was sponsored by the National Geographic Society. She rendered over 300 plates of deep-sea and shore fish and other animals.

Bostelmann's marine life art was published in several National Geographic magazines in the 1930s, 1940s, and beyond. Her depiction of the bioluminescence of unknown ocean life caused a stir in the oceanographic world.

Although she did not descend in the Bathysphere, her studies and final paintings were true to life at the time. Beebe described what he saw as he descended in the bathysphere through a direct telephone line to the ship above him. Detailed notes were taken by Gloria Hollister, a member of the research team. When Beebe exited the bathysphere, he immediately worked with Bostelmann as she put his descriptions to paper using watercolor, gouache, and pencil. She did don a 16-pound copper helmet with an air hose attached to the ship above and sat on a chair on the ocean floor (20–35 feet down) with her canvas attached to an iron music stand weighted with lead and her brushes tied to the stand as she painted with oil the fish she saw around her. Due to the change in available light at that depth, the colors in her paintings were muted.

The National Geographic featured full color plates (1936 and 1938) of her paintings for Dr. Roy W. Minor (1875–1955) of the New York Academy of Sciences, such as the Red-Plumed Worms and Brown Scale Worms living in the Sandy Mud Flats South of Cape Cod. She also illustrated and published 14 children's books, illustrated color plates of flora in additional National Geographic magazines and had textiles (bathroom towels and rugs, and handbags) of her sea life produced by Oppenheim and Collins in New York City, where they were also sold at Macy's department stores.

Later in her life, Bostelmann exhibited her Undersea Life and Exotic Flowers at various venues (the Bridgeport Flower Show, Bridgeport, Connecticut, 1953; the Blomquist-Symonds Studio, Meridan, Connecticut, 1955; the New Canaan Outdoor Art Show, New Canaan, Connecticut, 1957; the Stamford Museum and Nature Center, Stamford, Connecticut, 1957; the Exhibit of Oils at Pen and Brush, Greenwich Village, New York, 1957; the Darien Public Library, Darien, Connecticut, 1959).

Bostelmann died in December 1961. In May 1962, her daughter, Mrs. Gertraude Hadumodt Bostelmann Crumpton, held a showing of her mother's lifetime work. The retrospective show looked back over 50 years, including various artworks from Germany, and was held in Bostelmann's Old Stone House Studio in Darien, Connecticut. It had been her studio for the last 12 years.

Bostelmann's work is in several permanent collections, such as the Bermuda Art Museum, the National Geographic collection, and the Wildlife Conservation Society Archives. William Beebe owned much of her art, which he displayed in his New York apartment.
