= William Beebe =

American ornithologist, marine biologist, entomologist, and explorer (1877–1962)

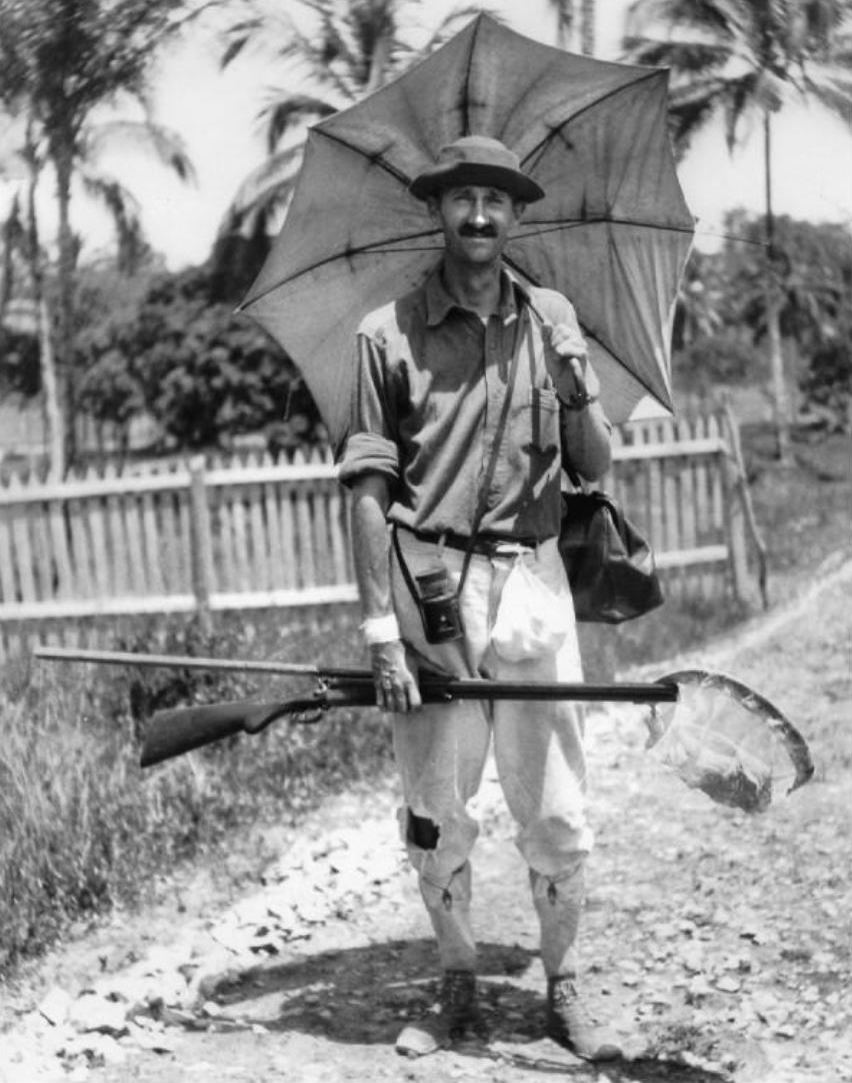
- William Beebe in British Guiana in 1917
- Born: Charles William Beebe; July 29, 1877; Brooklyn, New York, U.S.
- Died: June 4, 1962 (aged 84); Simla (near Arima), Trinidad and Tobago
- Known for: His deep dives in the Bathysphere; his monograph on pheasants, and numerous books on natural history
- Spouse(s): Mary Blair Rice, div. 1913, Helen (Ricker) Beebe
- Awards: Honorary doctorates from Tufts and Colgate University; Daniel Giraud Elliot Medal (1918); Geoffroy Saint-Hilaire Medal (1921); John Burroughs Medal (1926); Theodore Roosevelt Distinguished Service Medal (1953)
- Scientific career
- Fields: Naturalist
- Workplaces: New York Zoological Park

Charles William Beebe (/ˈbiːbi/ BEE-bee; July 29, 1877 – June 4, 1962) was an American naturalist, ornithologist, marine biologist, entomologist, explorer, and writer. He is remembered for the numerous expeditions he conducted for the New York Zoological Society, such as the Arcturus mission, his deep dives in the Bathysphere, and his prolific scientific writing for academic and popular audiences.

Born in Brooklyn, New York and raised in East Orange, New Jersey, Beebe left college before obtaining a degree to work at the then newly opened New York Zoological Park, where he was given the duty of caring for the zoo's birds. He quickly distinguished himself in his work for the zoo, first with his skill in designing habitats for its bird population, and soon also with a series of research expeditions of increasing length, including an expedition around the world to document the world's pheasants. These expeditions formed the basis for a large quantity of writing for both popular and academic audiences, including an account of his pheasant expedition titled A Monograph of the Pheasants and published in four volumes from 1918 to 1922. In recognition of the research conducted on his expeditions, he was granted honorary doctorates from Tufts and Colgate University.

During the course of his expeditions, Beebe gradually developed an interest in marine biology, ultimately leading to his 1930s dives in the Bathysphere, along with its inventor, Otis Barton, off the coast of Bermuda. This was the first time a biologist observed deep-sea animals in their native environment and set several successive records for the deepest dive ever performed by a human, the deepest of which stood until it was broken by Barton 15 years later. Following his Bathysphere dives, Beebe returned to the tropics and began to focus his study on the behavior of insects. In 1949, he founded a tropical research station in Trinidad and Tobago which he named Simla, and which remains in operation as part of the Asa Wright Nature Centre. Beebe's research at Simla continued until his death from pneumonia in 1962 at the age of 84.

William Beebe is regarded as one of the founders of the field of ecology, as well as one of the early 20th century's major advocates of conservation. He is also remembered for several theories he proposed about avian evolution which are now regarded as having been ahead of their time, particularly his 1915 hypothesis that the evolution of bird flight passed through a four-winged or "Tetrapteryx" stage, which has been supported by the 2003 discovery of Microraptor gui.

== Biography ==
=== Early life and education ===
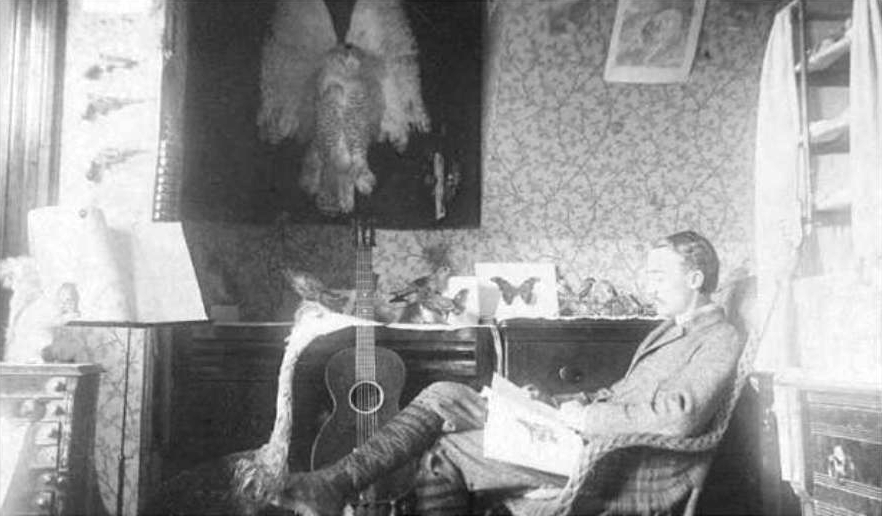
William Beebe at age 18, at his home in East Orange

Charles William Beebe was born in Brooklyn, New York, son of the newspaper executive Charles Beebe. Although some sources have described him as an only child, he had a younger brother named John who died in infancy. Early in his life, his family moved to East Orange, New Jersey, where he began to acquire both his fascination with the natural world and his tendency to record everything he saw. The American Museum of Natural History, which opened the year that Beebe was born, fostered Beebe's love of nature and was an early influence on him.

In September 1891, Beebe began attending East Orange High School. Although Beebe did not formally drop his first name "Charles" until 1915, before attending high school he was already commonly known as "William Beebe", as he would be known from this point onward. During his high school years Beebe developed an interest in collecting animals, particularly after receiving his first gun at the age of sixteen, and trained himself in taxidermy to preserve them. When he was unable to collect a specimen for himself, he often obtained it from a supply house known as Lattin's, or by trading with other collectors. Beebe's first article was published while he was still in high school, a description of a bird called a brown creeper, which appeared in the January 1895 issue of the magazine Harper's Young People.

In 1896, Beebe was accepted with advanced placement to Columbia University. While attending university, Beebe frequently split his time between the university and the American Museum of Natural history, many of whose researchers were also professors at Columbia. At Columbia he studied under Henry Fairfield Osborn, and developed a close relationship with him which would endure until Osborn's death in 1935.

While attending Columbia, Beebe persuaded his professors to sponsor him and several fellow students taking research trips to Nova Scotia, where he continued his hobby of collecting, as well as attempting to photograph difficult-to-observe scenes of birds and other animals. Several of Beebe's photographs from these expeditions were purchased by Columbia professors to use as slides during their lectures. During these trips, Beebe also developed an interest in dredging, the practice of using nets to haul up animals that lived deep underwater and attempting to study them before they died or disintegrated. Beebe never applied to receive a degree from Columbia, although years later he was granted honorary doctorates from both Tufts and Colgate University.

=== Employment at the Bronx Zoo ===
In November 1897, Frank Chapman sponsored Beebe to become an associate member of the American Ornithologists' Union, and the following month Beebe gave his first professional lecture on ornithology to a society called Uncle Clarence's Bergen Point Culture Club. In 1899, although he had completed all of the required courses for a degree in science from Columbia except for mathematics, he decided to forgo his studies in favor of an invitation from Osborn to work at the New York Zoological Park which was about to open. Several factors contributed to this decision, including both excitement at being part of the zoo, and the sense that his studies were putting too much of a strain on his family's finances.

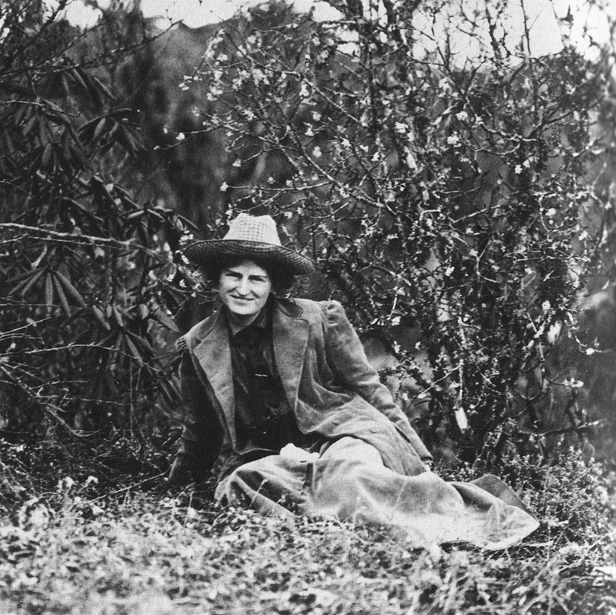
Mary Beebe, later known as Blair Niles, in 1910

Osborn appointed Beebe to the position of assistant curator of ornithology. As assistant curator, one of his principal jobs was to breed and rear the zoo's birds in order to sustain their population. Beebe placed much importance on the birds being given as much space as possible, and proposed the building of a "flying cage" the size of a football field. This was eventually built, although at less than half the size that Beebe had originally requested. While Beebe's flying cage was criticized as being based on an inaccurate understanding of birds' needs, it ultimately proved very successful.

In 1901, Beebe returned to Nova Scotia on his first expedition for the zoo, intending to collect marine animals by searching tide pools and with additional dredging. The following year he was promoted from assistant curator to the rank of a full curator, a post he held until 1918. He then went on to serve as an honorary curator from 1919 to 1962.

On August 6, 1902, Beebe was married to Mary Blair Rice, better known by her pen name Blair Niles. Blair subsequently accompanied Beebe on several of his expeditions, and as a writer herself, frequently assisted Beebe with his own writing. Beebe and Blair regarded their honeymoon, another trip to Nova Scotia, as a further opportunity for collecting.

The following February, Beebe, and Blair went on an expedition to the Florida Keys, because Beebe was suffering from a throat infection and the zoo believed that the warm climate would be beneficial to his health. This expedition was Beebe's introduction to the tropics, with which he developed a long-standing fascination. In July 1903, at the request of a lawyer named Louis Whealton whom the zoo's director William Temple Hornaday regarded as a potential donor to the zoo, Beebe and Blair went on another expedition to Virginia's Barrier Islands. Although it was intended as an expedition for the zoo, Beebe described it as "our third honeymoon this year".

By the end of 1903, at the age of 26, Beebe had published more than thirty-four articles and photographs in the past year. For his contributions to science, he was elected a fellow in the American Association for the Advancement of Science.

=== Early exploration and expeditions ===
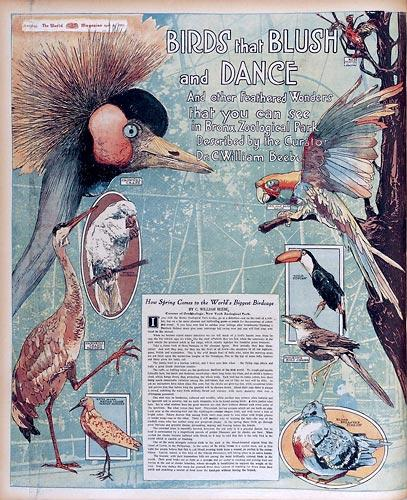
April 1906 cover story of New York World's Sunday magazine written by William Beebe, advertising the Bronx Zoo's diversity of birds

In December 1903, to avert another bout of Beebe's throat ailment, Hornaday sent him on an expedition to Mexico which would last until the following April. Since Mexico was still largely unstable at this point, he and Blair traveled on horseback and lived mostly in tents, and both carried revolvers for self-protection. Although the purpose of the expedition was to discover, identify and collect Mexico's birds, it has also been described as yet another honeymoon between him and Blair. Beebe's first book, titled Two Bird Lovers in Mexico, was an account of this expedition. The last chapter was written by Blair and was an explanation of how to plan and execute a vacation in the wilderness. The book was enthusiastically well received.

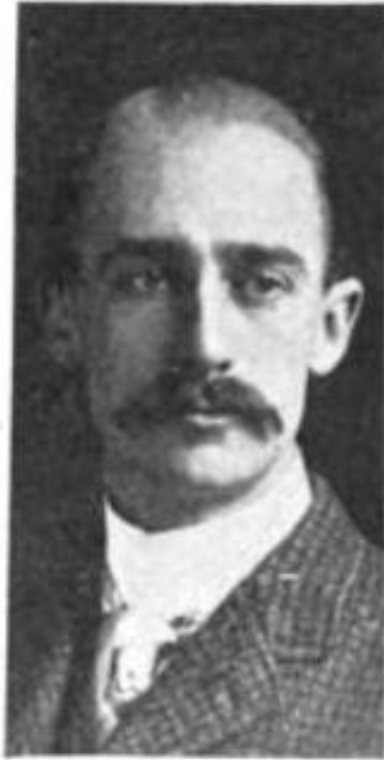
Beebe in 1906

Beebe's second book, The Bird, Its Form and Function, was published in 1906. This book was a reworking of a manuscript that Beebe had submitted to Henry Holt in 1902, but which Holt had asked him to expand into a major work on birds. In its finished form it represented a new kind of nature writing in that, although it presented technical information about bird biology and evolution, it did so in a way meant to be accessible to a general audience. It also represented an important turning point for Beebe, because in contrast to his youthful fascination with adding animals to his collection, in this book he was beginning to emphasize the importance of wildlife conservation. Regarding the killing of animals for the sole purpose of collecting, the book states:

And the next time you raise your gun to needlessly take a feathered life, think of the marvelous little engine which your lead will stifle forever; lower your weapon and look into the clear bright eyes of the bird whose body equals yours in physical perfection, and whose tiny brain can generate a sympathy, a love for its mate, which is sincerity and unselfishness suffers little when compared with human affection.

Although Beebe continued to shoot animals when it was necessary for examining them scientifically, he no longer regarded adding to a collection as a valid reason to take a life. In 1906 Beebe presented his own collection, which had grown to 990 specimens during his earlier years as a collector, as a gift to the zoo for educational and research purposes. For this gift, he was made a life member of the New York Zoological Society. The same year, he was also elected a fellow of the New York Academy of Sciences.

In 1907, the journal Zoologica was founded by Osborn and Hornaday specifically as a place for Beebe to publish his research. The first issue of the journal contained twenty papers, ten of which were written by Beebe, and two more of which were jointly written by him and Lee Saunders Crandall, the zoo's assistant curator of birds. The following year Beebe received a promotion from the Zoological Society, placing him on equal footing with the research scientists at the Museum of Natural History. This promotion explicitly granted him two months off each year, for further research expeditions. The first expedition conducted under his new privileges, beginning in February 1908, took him to Trinidad and Tobago and Venezuela to research birds and insects. During this expedition Beebe captured 40 live birds for the zoo, belonging to 14 different species.

At this point in his life, Beebe was forming a close friendship with then-president Theodore Roosevelt, which would last until Roosevelt's death in 1919. Beebe admired Roosevelt's skill as a field naturalist as well as his advocacy of conservation, and Roosevelt's fame made his support highly valuable in Beebe's scientific endeavors. Roosevelt in turn admired Beebe's writing and his respect for the natural world. Roosevelt frequently provided praise for Beebe's books, and went on to write introductions to Beebe's books Tropical Wild Life and Jungle Peace.

In February 1909, Beebe and Blair traveled to British Guiana, in the hope that with Roosevelt's support, it might be possible to establish a permanent field research station there. Another goal of this expedition was to find and capture a hoatzin, a bird whose clawed wings caused it to be considered an important link in the evolution of birds from reptiles. Beebe made extensive documentation of hoatzin behavior through field glasses, but their plans to capture one were foiled when they had to return home early due to Blair breaking her wrist. Despite their failure to obtain their most sought-after prize, the expedition still returned with 280 live birds of 51 species, 33 of which were new to the zoo, although several of these died or escaped during the long trip back to New York. Beebe summarized this expedition in his book Our Search for a Wilderness, which was enthusiastically well-reviewed.

=== The pheasant expedition ===
In December 1909, businessman and philanthropist Anthony R. Kuser proposed to the zoo that Beebe be allowed to go on a voyage around the world to document the world's pheasants, which would be financed by Kuser. Hornaday strongly objected to this proposal, describing Kuser as an "evil genius" who was attempting to steal Beebe away from his duties at the zoo. However, the zoo ultimately decided in Kuser's favor, partly because the scientific papers produced by Beebe's trip to Guiana had been beneficial to the zoo's reputation. Hornaday appointed Crandall as the zoo's acting curator of birds, giving him the duty of caring for its birds in Beebe's absence. Beebe and Blair left for their expedition accompanied by Robert Bruce Horsfall, whose job would be to provide illustrations of the birds for the book that would hopefully result from this expedition.

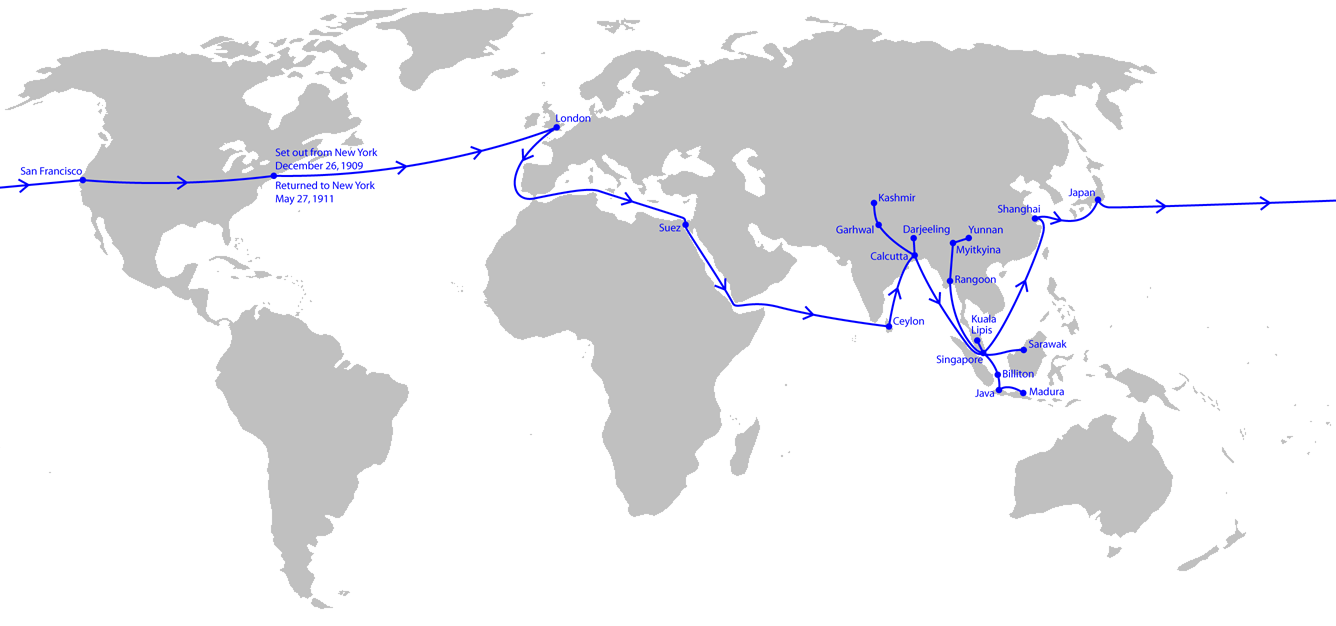
A map of the route taken by William Beebe during his pheasant expedition

After crossing the Atlantic Ocean on the RMS Lusitania to London, where they gathered the supplies they would need for their expedition, Beebe and his team traveled across the Mediterranean Sea to Egypt, through the Suez Canal, and across the Indian Ocean to Ceylon, where they began their task of documenting the native wildfowl. From Ceylon they traveled to Calcutta, with the goal of capturing the species of pheasants which live only in the Himalayas. By this point Beebe was beginning to conflict with Horsfall, who was unaccustomed to such expeditions. After Beebe had finished his documentation in the eastern part of the range, Horsfall refused to accompany Beebe in the western part of the range, causing Beebe to leave him in the town of Jorepokhri and continue his work in the Western Himalayas without him. Horsfall rejoined them in Calcutta, from which they sailed to Indonesia. The next ship took them to Singapore, where Beebe established a base of operations for the next stage of his expedition.

The expedition's next destination was Sarawak, on the island of Borneo. By the time they left Sarawak, the conflict between Beebe and Horsfall had grown to such a degree that Beebe decided Horsfall was endangering the expedition and must be sent home. In response to Beebe's dismissal, Horsfall retorted that he had been ill-treated by Beebe from the beginning of the expedition and that his subsequent actions had been for the express purpose of revenge. Continuing without Horsfall, Beebe and Blair traveled to Batavia in Java, to the island of Madura just to the north, and to Belitung between Borneo and Sumatra.

Finished in Java, Beebe and his crew sailed north from Singapore to Kuala Lumpur to begin exploring Malaya. After Malaya, the next portion of their expedition took them to Burma, where they arrived in Rangoon and traveled by rail to Myitkyina. In Burma Beebe succumbed temporarily to a bout of depression, and it was several days before he was able to resume working or continue the expedition. He attributed his recovery to the pile of penny dreadful novels he discovered in his bungalow at Pungatong, which he then read constantly for the next few days.

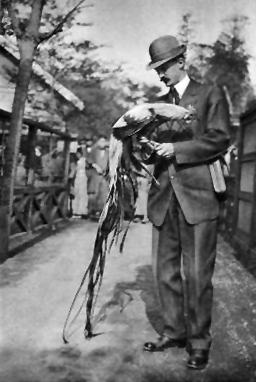
William Beebe with a Japanese long-tailed fowl (red junglefowl)

The last portion of Beebe's journey took him to China, from which they made an unplanned visit to Japan to escape a riot as well as a surge of bubonic plague. When the plague and riots had subsided, Beebe returned to China to document the local pheasant species, then made a second visit to Japan to study pheasants kept in the Imperial Preserves there. In Japan, Beebe was given two cranes by the Imperial Household in exchange for a pair of swans, which were unknown in Japan.

His expedition was completed after a total of 17 months, Beebe and Blair crossed the Pacific to San Francisco, then crossed the United States to return to their home in New York. Their expedition had obtained live or stuffed specimens of nearly all the pheasants he had sought, and also produced extensive notes about their behavior. Some of these pheasants, such as Sclater's impeyan or Himalayan monal, had never before been seen in the wild by Americans or Europeans. Beebe's observations of sexual dimorphism in pheasants during this expedition led him to become the first biologist to correctly understand the mechanism by which this aspect of sexual selection operates. based on his observations he also proposed a new evolutionary model of pheasant ancestry, involving a period of rapid diversification followed by more typical and gradual changes. Although this evolutionary model is now taken for granted, in William Beebe's time it was a novel idea.

In January 1913, Blair left Beebe for Reno intending to divorce him, since at this time in history it was easier to obtain a divorce in Reno than in most other areas of the United States. The divorce was granted on August 29, 1913, after Blair had spent the minimum requirement of six months as a resident in Reno. Obtaining a divorce in Reno required a person to demonstrate that their spouse had committed either adultery or extreme cruelty; Blair's complaint accused Beebe of the latter, claiming that during the pheasant expedition he had threatened to commit suicide by "throwing himself in the river, shooting himself through the roof of the mouth with a revolver, and by cutting his throat with a razor." Beebe made very little effort to contest the divorce and did not appear in court to offer any testimony. Although newspapers at the time reported Blair's accusations uncritically, with headlines such as "Naturalist was cruel", modern biographers consider it more likely that Blair resorted to hyperbole to make a divorce case. A week after her divorce from Beebe, Blair was remarried to their next-door neighbor Robin Niles, suggesting that the true reason for the divorce may have been cuckoldry. On the other hand, some biographers have suggested that Beebe suffered a nervous breakdown during the expedition and that he may have contributed his own part to Blair's alienation.

Blair's departure came as a shock to Beebe, and he was severely depressed for more than a year afterward. Despite her assistance during the pheasant expedition, Beebe excised any mention of her from the monograph he was preparing based on the data gathered during it.

By the end of 1914, Beebe's pheasant monograph was essentially complete in the manuscript. While the text was written by Beebe, the illustrations were provided by several artists: Robert Bruce Horsfall, who had accompanied Beebe on the expedition, painted the environmental scenes for the illustrations' backgrounds, while the pheasants themselves were painted by other artists including George Edward Lodge, Charles R. Knight, and Louis Agassiz Fuertes. Due to the elaborate nature of the book's color artwork, no American publisher was considered capable of reproducing it. The publisher which Beebe chose for his work was George Witherby and Sons of London, as a result of their success publishing the artwork of John James Audubon. The reproduction of the illustrations themselves was to be handled by several companies in Germany and Austria. Reproductions of the illustrations were in the process of being printed when World War I began, holding up the completion of the project for the next four years.

=== Return to Guiana and World War I ===
Beebe undertook an expedition to Brazil in 1915, to capture more birds for the zoo. This expedition was an important turning point for Beebe in several ways. Beebe had far more field experience than either of the two others accompanying him on the expedition, G. Inness Hartley and Herbert Atkins, making this his introduction to the role of a mentor. During this expedition, Beebe was also amazed to discover the number and variety of organisms living under a single tree and pioneered the method of studying a small area of wilderness for an extended amount of time. This expedition marked the beginning of a shift for Beebe from ornithology to the study of tropical ecosystems.

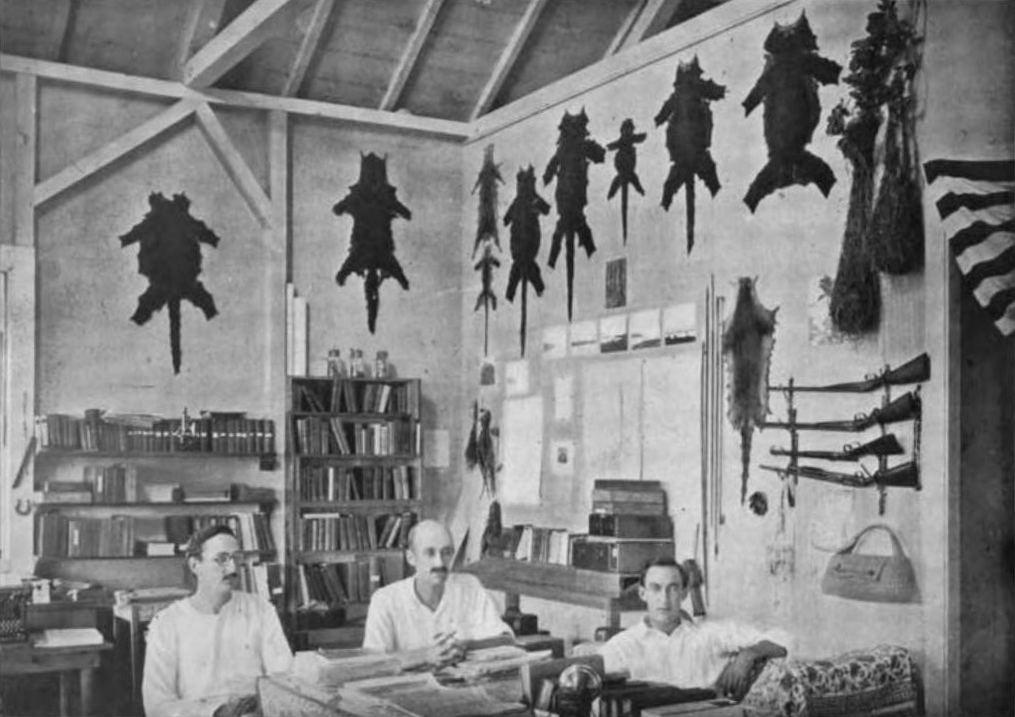
William Beebe (center) with Paul Howes and Inness Hartley in the laboratory at Kalacoon

In 1916, Beebe traveled to Georgetown in pursuit of his earlier goal of establishing a permanent field research station in Guiana. After following several leads which came to nothing, his goal was realized when George Withers, who owned a rubber plantation on the Mazaruni River, offered him the use of a large house on his property for this purpose. Soon after Beebe and his researchers moved into the plantation house, which was known by the name of Kalacoon, they were paid a visit by Theodore Roosevelt and his family. Roosevelt subsequently wrote an article about the station for Scribner's Magazine, which helped to build public support for the station.

The establishment of the Kalacoon research station enabled Beebe to research the ecology of the surrounding jungle in far more detail than had been possible during his earlier expeditions. Using Kalacoon as his base of operations, Beebe performed a novel type of study: methodically dissecting a small area of jungle, and all of the animals which inhabit it, from the top of the canopy to below the ground. In a second study, Beebe performed the same task for a much larger area of jungle, approximately a quarter-mile (0.4 km) square. During his first season at Kalacoon in 1916, Beebe brought back 300 living specimens for the zoo. This time he succeeded at capturing a hoatzin, the bird that he had narrowly missed during his earlier trip to Guiana, although he was unable to keep it alive for the zoo during the trip back to New York.

Beebe summarized his discoveries at Kalacoon in his 1917 book Tropical Wild Life in British Guiana, which inspired many other researchers to plan trips to Kalacoon or to establish their own field research stations of the type that Beebe had pioneered.

Beebe was eager to serve in World War I, but at 40 he was considered too old for regular service. With Roosevelt's help, he secured a post-training American pilot for a flight squadron on Long Island. His training work was halted when, veering to avoid a photographer who had run in front of his airplane as he landed, he crashed on landing and severely injured his right wrist. During a second trip to Kalacoon while his wrist healed, Beebe was further devastated to discover that due to wartime demand for rubber, the entire jungle surrounding the house had been clear-cut to make room for rubber trees. Since the purpose of Kalacoon station had been to study the jungle, the jungle's destruction left Beebe with no choice but to close the station and return with its supplies to New York. Combined with his earlier loss of Blair, the effect of losing Kalacoon plunged Beebe into depression. This did not go unnoticed by Beebe's mentor Osborn, who expressed concern about it in a letter to Madison Grant, writing "I find that he is worried and far from well. [...] Without telling him so, we must take care of him."

In October 1917, Beebe had his opportunity to serve in the war. With the help of a letter of recommendation from Roosevelt, he was given the duty of flying aerial photography planes over German gun emplacements. He also spent time in trenches and accompanied a Canadian Indian platoon on a night raid. Beebe subsequently wrote several articles describing his war experience for Scribner's Magazine and Atlantic Monthly. Beebe generally did not make the exact nature of his military service clear in his writings about it, although he expressed his general dismay at the realities of the war. The best-known of these accounts is provided by the opening paragraph of his 1918 book Jungle Peace:

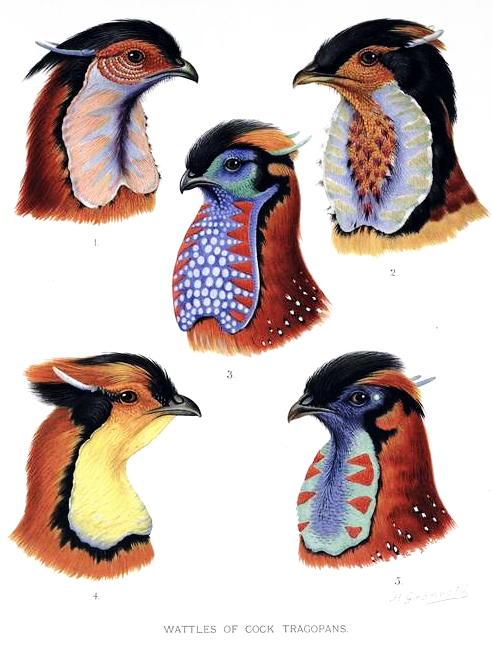
Five species of Tragopan pheasants from William Beebe's book A Monograph of the Pheasants, published 1918–1922

After creeping through slime-filled holes beneath the shrieking of swift metal; after splashing one's plane through companionable clouds three miles above the little jagged, hero-filled ditches, and dodging other sudden-born clouds of nauseous fumes and blasting heart of steel; after these, one craves thoughts of comfortable hens, sweet apple orchards, or the ineffable themes of opera. And when nerves have cried for a time "enough" and an unsteady hand threatens to turn a joystick into a signpost to Charon, the mind seeks amelioration—some symbol of worthy content and peace—and for my part, I turn with all desire to the jungles of the tropics.

Beebe's position in the Zoological Society changed in 1918: He was given the title of Honorary Curator of Birds and was made the director of the newly created Department of Tropical Research. With his new position, Beebe no longer had the duty of caring for the zoo's animals, freeing him to devote himself fully to his writing and research. Beebe's duties as curator were passed to Lee Crandall, the former Assistant Curator who had worked under Beebe, although Crandall continued to rely on Beebe for help treating illness in birds, and caring for the exotic birds brought back from Beebe's expeditions.

The first volume of Beebe's pheasant monograph was published that fall, although the ongoing war made it unclear when the remaining three volumes would be published. The first volume was highly praised by reviewers, and received the Daniel Giraud Elliot Medal from the National Academy of Sciences in 1918. In January 1919 Roosevelt, who was severely ill by this point, wrote to Beebe from his hospital bed congratulating Beebe on the publication of his monograph. His letter of congratulation to Beebe was the last letter that Roosevelt wrote before his death. Volume II of the monograph was published in 1921, and volumes III and IV were published in 1922. The completed work, titled A Monograph of the Pheasants, has been considered by some reviewers to be possibly the greatest ornithological monograph of the twentieth century.

In 1919, Osborn helped secure Beebe a new research station in Guiana to replace Kalacoon: Beebe was offered Kartabo Point, an outpost of a New York-based mining corporation. Beebe was enthusiastic about the new station, and it proved very successful for conducting the same detailed analyses of wildlife within small areas that had been performed at Kalacoon. At Kartabo Beebe discovered the phenomenon known as an ant mill, a column of ants following itself in an endless loop until nearly all of them died of exhaustion.

=== Galápagos expeditions ===
Beebe was eager to undertake an expedition to the Galápagos Islands, intending to obtain more detailed data in support of evolution than Charles Darwin had been able to collect in his earlier visit. In 1923, Harrison Williams agreed to finance such an expedition, and Beebe was provided with a 250-foot (76 m) steam yacht called the Noma for this purpose along with a support crew. The support crew included several scientists who had worked with Beebe previously and several artists including the marine painter Harry Hoffman, as well as some of Williams' friends whose inclusion was a condition for Williams' agreement to fund the expedition. Passing through the Sargasso Sea on the way to the Galápagos, Beebe was fascinated by the diversity of life that could be found in the sargassum weed floating on the surface and spent several days scooping the weed from the water to examine the creatures that lived in it.

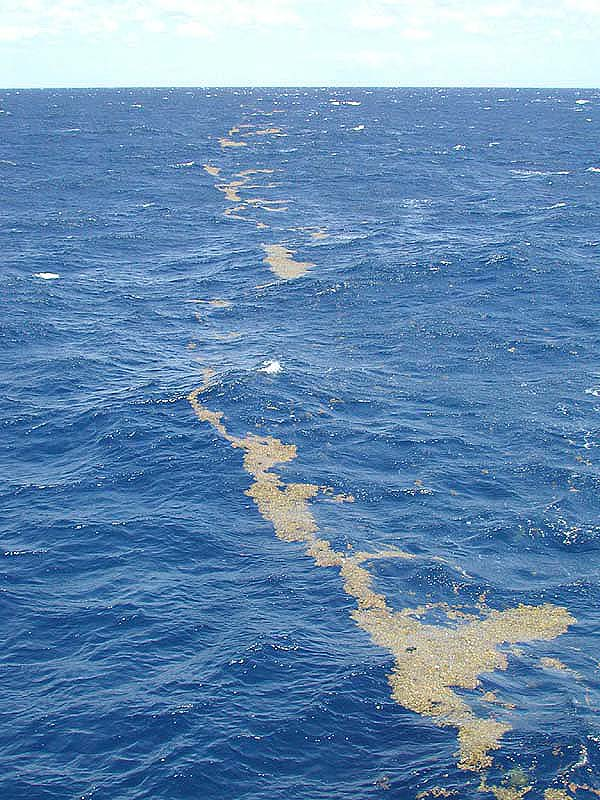
Sargassum in the Sargasso Sea

Beebe's first expedition to the Galápagos lasted twenty days, broken into two ten-day periods, between which the Noma was forced to return to Panama for fresh water and coal. During this expedition he documented the unique ways that animals that inhabit the Galápagos have evolved in response to the absence of predators. The Galápagos animals generally showed no fear of humans, causing the team to have a high degree of success at capturing live specimens for the zoo. Beebe also discovered a previously unknown bay on Genovesa Island (also known as Tower Island) in the Galápagos, which he named Darwin Bay, and documented the diversity of animal life that inhabited it. During the return to New York from this expedition, Beebe continued to dredge animals from the sea, using a pair of new devices he had devised to assist himself with this: a "pulpit", an iron cage affixed to the bow of the ship that enabled its occupant to examine the surface of the sea more closely; and a "boom walk", a 30-foot (9.1 m) boom jutting from the side of the ship from which he suspended himself. The book in which Beebe summarized this expedition, titled Galápagos: World's End, was an instant best-seller and remained on the New York Times top ten list for several months.

In 1924, Beebe went on another expedition to his Guiana research station of Kartabo, intending to continue the detailed documentation of the tropical ecosystem that he had begun at Kalacoon. The paper which finally resulted from this study was published in Zoologica in 1925 and was the first study of its kind in the developing field of tropical ecology. Beebe continued to battle depression during this trip to Kartabo, both over his earlier loss of Blair, and over the death of his mother Nettie, who had died shortly before the beginning of the expedition.

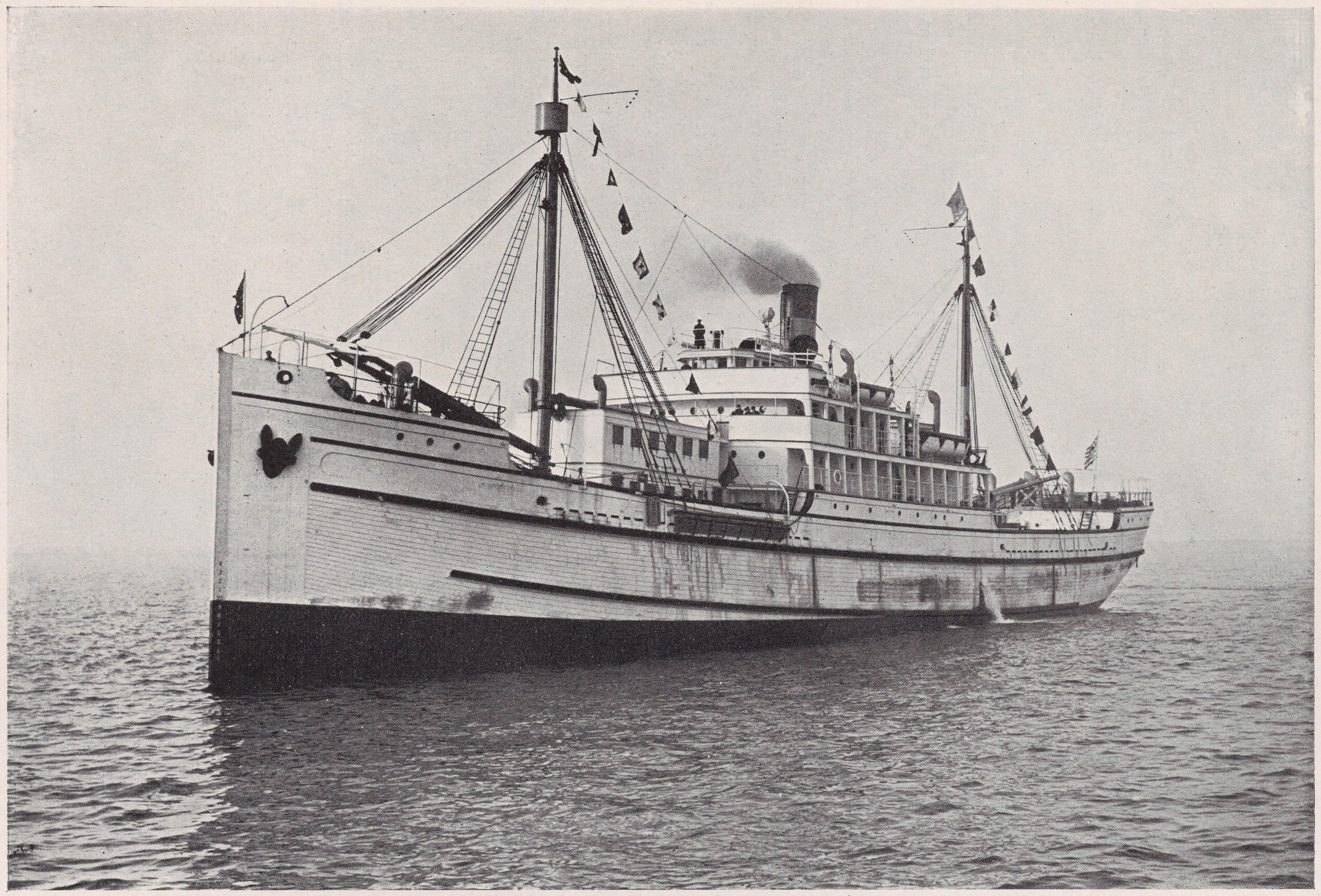
Arcturus during Beebe's 1925 expedition.

Despite his ongoing research in Guiana, what Beebe desired most was to return to the Galápagos, this time with a properly fitted-out scientific research vessel that possessed the ability to dredge animals from beneath the ocean. In 1925, Beebe set out on a second Galápagos expedition, the Arcturus Oceanographic Expedition, backed by Williams and several other donors. His ship for this expedition was the Arcturus, presented to the New York Zoological Society by Executive Committee member Henry D. Whiton. (Though Beebe and others called Arcturus a "steam yacht", it had been built as a Design 1065 wooden-hulled cargo ship for the United States Shipping Board's Emergency Fleet Corporation during World War I; originally named SS Clio, it had later been acquired by Union Sulphur Company, of which Whiton was the former president.) Arcturus was much larger than the Noma, at 280 ft (85.3 m) long and over three times the internal volume (gross register tonnage), and was capable of being at sea for extended periods of time. The Arcturus was outfitted with Beebe's pulpit and boom walk from the Noma, as well as cages and tanks for live animals, chemicals and vials to preserve dead ones, and a darkroom for developing film and studying the bioluminescent animals they hoped to encounter.

The Arcturus did not encounter the thick mats of sargassum in the Sargasso Sea that Beebe was hoping to study, but Beebe and his crew experienced great success dredging creatures from the sea off the coast of Saint Martin and Saba. In the Pacific, they encountered a strange boundary between two currents of very different temperatures, containing a vast diversity of life on the border between the two. He sailed along the border between the currents for several days to document it, theorizing that it could be the cause of the unusual climate which South America had recently been experiencing. Beebe's study of these currents, and their effect on the climate of South America, is the earliest known study of the phenomenon known as El Niño.

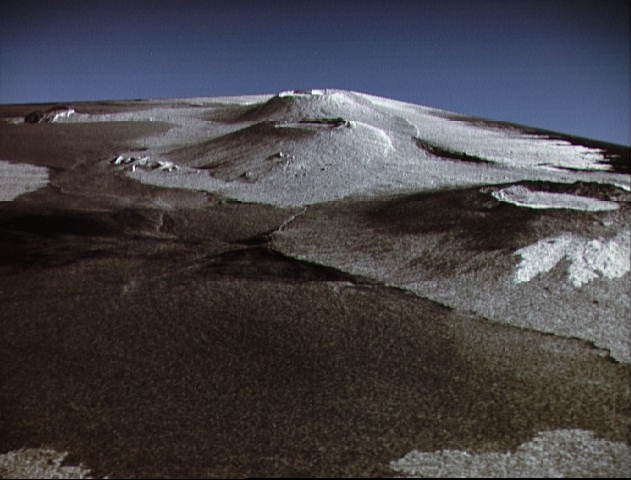
Volcanoes of western Albemarle/Isabella Island, where William Beebe observed a volcanic eruption in 1925

Anchoring near Darwin Bay, Beebe made his first attempt at studying sea animals in their native environment by descending into the ocean in a diving helmet. Beebe continued to perform helmet dives throughout his Galápagos expedition, documenting several previously unknown sea animals. In addition to his helmet dives, Beebe applied the same method of research that he had pioneered in the tropics to a small area of ocean, sailing in circles around it for ten days to document all actions and interactions of marine life within that area. This study yielded a collection of 3,776 fish of 136 species, many of them also new to science.

While anchored off the Galápagos, Beebe and his crew noticed volcanic activity on Albemarle Island, and set out to investigate it. Anchoring in a small cove, Beebe and his assistant John Tee-Van searched for an active crater where they could observe the eruption and were nearing exhaustion by the time they found one. As he observed the crater, Beebe realized that the air surrounding it was filled with noxious gases, and narrowly avoided suffocation before staggering away from it. Observing the eruption from his ship for another two days, as well as again at a later point in the expedition, Beebe recorded how numerous birds and marine animals were killed after either failing to escape the lava or drawing too close to it in an attempt to scavenge other animals that had died.

During the return from the Galápagos through the Sargasso Sea, Beebe once again failed to find the thick mats of Sargassum whose study had been one of the primary goals of the expedition. Searching for a way to satisfy his expedition's donors, Beebe hit upon the idea of documenting the marine life of the Hudson Gorge just beyond the shore of New York City. Applying the same techniques to studying the Hudson Gorge that he had used in the Galápagos, Beebe encountered a surprising variety of sea animals, many of which had previously been thought to be exclusive to the tropics.

Shortly after Beebe's return from this expedition, Anthony Kuser requested that Beebe produce a condensed, popular version of his pheasant monograph. The book which resulted from this, titled Pheasants: Their Lives and Homes (also known by the title Pheasants of the World), was released in 1926 and received the John Burroughs Medal. During the course of writing this book, Beebe was reminded of many experiences during the pheasant expedition which he had not included in his original monograph, and wrote an additional book titled Pheasant Jungles about his adventures during this expedition. While A Monograph of the Pheasants had been a factual account of this expedition, Pheasant Jungles was a somewhat fictionalized account, in which Beebe altered some aspects of his experience to appeal to a wider audience.

=== Haiti and Bermuda ===
In 1927, Beebe went on an expedition to Haiti to document its marine life. Anchoring his ship the Lieutenant in the harbor of Port-au-Prince, he performed over 300 helmet dives examining the area's coral reefs and classifying the fish that inhabited them. These dives involved several technological innovations: a watertight brass box which could be used to house a camera for underwater photography, and a telephone which was incorporated into the diving helmet, allowing the diver to dictate observations to someone on the surface instead of having to take notes underwater. Within a hundred days, Beebe and his team had created a catalog of species inhabiting the area nearly as long as what had been assembled on the neighboring island of Puerto Rico in the past four hundred years. In 1928 Beebe and Tee-Van published an illustrated and annotated list of 270 such species, which was expanded in 1935 bringing the total to 324. Beebe provided an account of this expedition in his 1928 book Beneath Tropic Seas, which was the first of his books to receive less than enthusiastic reviews, due to its episodic structure.

As he gained experience with helmet diving, Beebe soon became an enthusiastic advocate of it, believing it to be something that should be experienced by everyone who had the opportunity to do so. He later went so far as to suggest that beachfront homes would someday contain their own underwater gardens, to be experienced with the help of diving helmets:

If you wish to make a garden, choose some beautiful slope or reef grotto and with a hatchet chop and pry off coral boulders with waving purple sea-plumes and golden sea-fans and great particolored anemones. Wedge these into crevices, and in a few days, you will have a sunken garden in a new and miraculous sense. As birds collect about the luxuriant growths of a garden in the upper air, so hosts of fish will follow your labors, great crabs and starfish will creep thither, and now and then fairy jellyfish will throb past, superior in beauty to anything in the upper world, more delicate and graceful than any butterfly.

By this point in his life Beebe was developing a close friendship with Helen Ricker, an American romance novelist who went by the pen name of Elswyth Thane, who had met Beebe in 1925. Very little of their early correspondence survives, but Elswyth had idolized Beebe for years, and her first novel Riders of the Wind was devoted to him. The novel was an account of a young woman who falls in love with and eventually marries, a much older adventurer who strongly resembled Beebe. Beebe and Elswyth were married on September 22, 1927, when Beebe was 50. Due to Elswyth's tendency to misrepresent her age, conflicting accounts exist of how old she was when she and Beebe were married, ranging from 23 to 28. Elswyth and Beebe had an open marriage, in which neither expected sexual exclusivity from the other so long as their life together was not damaged.

Although Riders of the Wind was partially based on Beebe's pheasant expedition, Elswyth did not enjoy Beebe's current research. She disliked the heat of the tropics and was unwilling to go with Beebe to Kartabo. As a compromise, Beebe decided to continue his marine research in Bermuda, where she and Beebe had spent their honeymoon. Bermuda's governor Louis Bols introduced Beebe to Prince George, who was fascinated by Beebe's books, and Prince George persuaded Beebe to take him helmet diving. Governor Bols and Prince George subsequently offered Beebe Nonsuch Island, a 25-acre (0.10 km^{2}) island off the east coast of Bermuda, for use as a research station.

With the financial help of his sponsors, Beebe planned to use his new research station on Nonsuch Island to conduct a thorough study of an 8-mile (13 km) square area of ocean, documenting every living thing they could find from the surface to a depth of 2 miles (3.2 km). However, Beebe's ability to research the deep ocean using these methods was constrained by the inherent limitations of dredging, which could only provide an incomplete picture of the animals living there. Beebe compared the knowledge that could be gained of the deep ocean from dredging to what a visitor from Mars could learn about a fog-shrouded earthly city by using a dredge to pick up bits of debris from a street. Beebe began planning to create an underwater exploration device, which he could use to descend into the depths and observe these environments directly. The New York Times carried articles describing Beebe's plans, which called for a diving bell with the shape of a cylinder.

These articles caught the attention of Otis Barton, an engineer who had long admired Beebe and who had his own ambition to become a deep-sea explorer. Barton was convinced that Beebe's design for a diving vessel would never be capable of withstanding the extreme pressure of the deep ocean, and with the help of a friend who arranged a meeting with Beebe, proposed an alternative design to him. Barton's design called for a spherical vessel, which was the strongest possible shape for resisting high pressure. Barton had the good fortune that years earlier, Theodore Roosevelt had proposed a similar idea to Beebe, and Beebe approved of Barton's design. Beebe and Barton made a deal: Barton would pay for the sphere and all of the other equipment to go with it. In return, Beebe would pay for other expenses such as chartering a ship to raise and lower the sphere, and as the owner of the sphere, Barton would accompany Beebe on his expeditions in it. Beebe named their vessel the Bathysphere, from the Greek prefix bathy- meaning "deep" combined with "sphere".

=== Work at Nonsuch Island ===
From 1930 to 1934, Beebe and Barton used the Bathysphere to conduct a series of dives of increasing depth off the coast of Nonsuch Island, becoming the first people to observe deep-sea animals in their native environment. The Bathysphere was lowered into the ocean using a steel cable, and a second cable carried a phone line which the Bathysphere's occupants used to communicate with the surface, as well as an electrical cable for a searchlight to illuminate animals outside the Bathysphere. Beebe's observations were relayed up the phone line to be recorded by Gloria Hollister, his chief technical associate who was also in charge of preparing specimens obtained from dredging. Beebe and Barton made a total of 35 dives in the Bathysphere, setting several consecutive world records for the deepest dive ever performed by a human. The record set by the deepest of these, to a depth of 3,028 feet (923 m) on August 15, 1934, lasted until it was broken by Barton in 1949.

In 1931, Beebe and Barton's Bathysphere dives were interrupted for a year due to technical problems and uncooperative weather. An additional difficulty in 1931 was the death of Beebe's father, and Beebe left Nonsuch Island for a week to attend his father's funeral. A second year-long interruption occurred in 1933, and was caused in part by a lack of funds due to the Great Depression. Although Beebe and Barton performed no dives in 1933, their work gathered a large amount of publicity when the Bathysphere was displayed in a special exhibit for the American Museum of Natural History, and later at the Century of Progress World's Fair in Chicago, where they shared the fair's Hall of Science with Auguste Piccard. Beebe and Barton also obtained publicity for their dives from several articles Beebe wrote describing them for National Geographic, and from an NBC radio broadcast in which Beebe's voice transmitted up the phone line from inside the Bathysphere was broadcast nationally over the radio.

Although Beebe attempted to ensure that Barton would receive credit as the Bathysphere's inventor and Beebe's fellow diver, the popular media tended to ignore Barton and pay attention only to Beebe. Barton was often resentful of this, believing Beebe to be deliberately hogging the fame. Beebe in turn lacked patience for Barton's unpredictable moods and felt that Barton did not display the proper respect for the natural world. Still, Beebe and Barton both had something the other needed: Beebe for his experience as a marine biologist and Barton for his mechanical skill. Out of pragmatic concern for the success of their lives, they managed to resolve their disagreements well enough to work together at Nonsuch Island, although they did not remain on good terms afterward.

Likely, Beebe became romantically involved with Hollister during his work at Nonsuch Island. An entry in Beebe's personal journal, written in a secret code that he used when describing things he wished kept secret, reads "I kissed her [Gloria] and she loves me." It is unclear whether Elswyth knew of Beebe's affair with Gloria, but if she did she appears to not have minded it. In addition to the open nature of their marriage, Elswyth described in a 1940s interview with Today's Woman magazine that she enjoyed the knowledge that Beebe was attractive to women.

Beebe continued to conduct marine research after 1934, but he felt that he had seen what he wanted to see using the Bathysphere and that further drives were too expensive for whatever knowledge he gained from them to be worth the cost. With the help of Beebe's friend the physician Henry Lloyd, Beebe conducted an expedition in the West Indies examining the stomach contents of tuna, which uncovered previously unknown larval forms of several species of fish. Shortly after returning, Beebe set out on a longer expedition to the waters around Baja California, financed by the Californian businessman Templeton Crocker on board his yacht the Zaca. The goal of this expedition was to study the area's undersea fauna utilizing dredging and helmet diving, and Beebe and his team were surprised by the diversity of animals that they encountered there. In 1937 Beebe went on a second expedition aboard the Zaca, documenting the native wildlife along the Pacific Coast from Mexico to Colombia. During this expedition, rather than focusing on either sea animals as he had at Nonsuch Island or on birds as he had earlier in his life, he attempted to document all aspects of the ecosystem. Beebe described his two expeditions onboard the Zaca in his books Zaca Venture and The Book of Bays, in which he emphasized his concern for threatened habitats and his dismay at human destruction.

During the two Zaca expeditions Beebe was accompanied by his longtime assistant John Tee-Van as well as Jocelyn Crane, a young carcinologist who had first worked for Beebe at Nonsuch Island in 1932, and who would subsequently be among Beebe's most cherished associates for the rest of his life. Like Hollister before her, Crane would eventually become Beebe's lover during the long expeditions that Beebe made without Elswyth's companionship. During this time Beebe was also forming a close friendship with Winnie-the-Pooh's creator A. A. Milne, who wrote of Half Mile Down "I don't know which I envy you most: all those moral and physical qualities which you have and I lack, or all that wonder of a new world. [...] One of the few things in the world of which I am really proud is that I know Will Beebe."

=== Return to the tropics ===
Although Beebe continued to use Nonsuch Island as his base of operations throughout the 1930s, with the onset of World War II in 1939 it was announced that the ferry linking Bermuda to New York would soon be making its final run, requiring Beebe and his team to hastily abandon their station there. Transportation to and from Bermuda resumed in 1940, and Beebe returned there in May 1941, but the environment was slowly being transformed due to the war. A large number of military ships made docking difficult, most of the island's reefs were being destroyed to construct an airfield, and the combination of construction activity and pollution made observing the sea life impossible. Appalled by the destruction, Beebe finally rented his station at Nonsuch Island to a military contractor and returned to New York.

With the loss of their station in Bermuda, Beebe and Elswyth gave up on their compromise of finding a research station where they could both be happy. Elswyth, who was most content in temperate environments, began searching for a home in New England where she could continue her writing. Meanwhile, Beebe began searching for a new tropical research station to replace Kartabo, which had fallen victim to deforestation just like Kalacoon before it. Beebe eventually helped Elswyth purchase a small farm near Wilmington, Vermont, where he visited her frequently. Elswyth explained in a magazine interview that she was uncomfortable on Beebe's expeditions, so the two of them had agreed that they would keep their careers separate from their private lives.

With the financial assistance of Standard Oil and the Guggenheim Foundation, Beebe established his next research station in Caripito, a small city in Venezuela around 100 miles (160 km) west of Trinidad and Tobago. Beebe and his team used this station to study the ecology of the region and recorded how its inhabitants were affected by its cycle of wet and dry seasons. One important study which resulted from this region was the first documentation of rhinoceros beetles using their horns in competition between males, proving that their horns were an adaptation for sexual selection rather than for defense against predators. Although Beebe's research at Caripito was productive, he felt that the extremity of its wet-dry cycle made it impractical as a research station, and the expanding oil operations in the region were in danger of destroying the local environment. For these reasons, Beebe did not return to Caripito after his first season there.

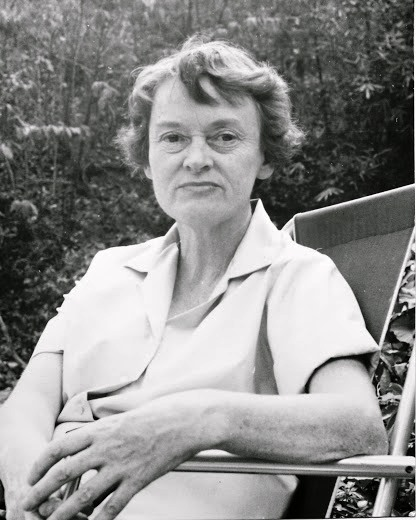
Jocelyn Crane visiting William Beebe Tropical Research Station, Simla, Trinidad and Tobago c. 1960

In the spring of 1944, Jocelyn Crane returned to Venezuela to search for a location for a new field station to replace the one at Caripito. The location that she found, known as Rancho Grande, had initially been intended as a palace for Venezuela's dictator Juan Vicente Gómez in the Henri Pittier National Park. The palace's construction had been left unfinished after Gómez's death, and since then the building's vast corridors and ballrooms had become the home of jaguars, tapirs and sloths. Unlike Beebe's other tropical research stations, which had been located in lowland regions, Rancho Grande was located on a mountainside in what Beebe described as "the ultimate cloud jungle". Creole Petroleum, a Venezuelan spin-off of Standard, agreed to cover the cost of the station and finished a small portion of the vast structure for Beebe and his team to use. Beebe and his team began work there in 1945, staying as guests of the Venezuelan government.

Rancho Grande was located at a mountain pass in a branch of the Andes known as the Venezuelan Coastal Range, which was an important migration route for butterflies, and the station proved very lucrative in the study of insects. During his work at Rancho Grande, Beebe broke his leg in a fall from a ladder, and the forced immobility which resulted from having his leg in a cast presented him with a new opportunity for observing the area's wildlife. At his request, he and his chair were transported into the nearby jungle, and as he sat motionless the wild animals around him soon began to go about their business without noticing his presence. His immobility also presented him with the opportunity to spend hours at a time observing a pair of bat falcons through binoculars, documenting the behavior of their two chicks and every prey item fed to them by their parents. His observations documented several behaviors which were new to science, including the first documented example of play in birds.

Although Beebe and his team enjoyed rewarding seasons at Rancho Grande in 1945 and 1946, they did not return there in 1947. The reason they gave in their annual report was that the previous two seasons had produced so much material that they needed an additional year to analyze it, but in reality, this was more the result of insufficient funding as well as the unstable state of Venezuelan politics. Beebe returned to Rancho Grande in 1948, where he completed several technical papers about the migration patterns of birds and insects, as well as a comprehensive study of the area's ecology which he coauthored with Jocelyn Crane. Realizing that the area's politics might soon put an end to their research there, in spring of 1948 Jocelyn made a side trip to Trinidad and Tobago in hope of finding a site for a research station where the politics would be more secure. Finally, when the 1948 Venezuelan coup d'état installed Marcos Pérez Jiménez as Venezuela's dictator, Beebe decided that he could no longer continue to work in Venezuela. Beebe described his experiences at Rancho Grande in his 1949 book High Jungle, which was the last of Beebe's major books.

In January 1950, the New York Zoological Society celebrated to commemorate the 50th anniversary of Beebe's work for them. He was by this point the only remaining member of the zoo's original staff, and had produced more scholarly papers and publicity than any other employee. Letters and testimonials poured in from other scientists with whom Beebe had worked, attesting to their admiration of him and his influence on them. One letter from the Harvard biologist Ernst Mayr wrote that Beebe's work had been an inspiration to his own, particularly A Monograph of the Pheasants and Beebe's books about jungle wildlife.

=== Final years in Trinidad and Tobago ===
The product of Jocelyn Crane's search for a potential research station in Trinidad and Tobago was a house on a hill overlooking the Arima Valley, which was known as Verdant Vale. In 1949, Beebe bought this estate to use a permanent research station to replace Rancho Grande. Beebe renamed the estate Simla, after the hill in India that featured in Rudyard Kipling's writings. He later described the sense of destiny that marked his introduction to the estate:

We had climbed the winding road in a tropical downpour. As we came out below the outermost wall, the sun broke through, three house wrens sang at once, and a double rainbow sprayed the valley with infrared and ultraviolet. We would not have been human if we had refused to recognize omens.

At Simla Beebe and his team worked closely together with Asa and Newcome Wright, the owners of the adjacent Spring Hill estate, who provided accommodations for them while water and electricity were connected at Simla. Although the initial purchase of Simla had contained only the house and 22 acres (0.089 km^{2}) of the forest surrounding it, Beebe soon realized that this was insufficient for the research he wished to conduct, and purchased another neighboring estate known as St. Pat's which contained an additional 170 acres (0.69 km^{2}). In 1953, Beebe donated both properties to the New York Zoological Society for one dollar, giving him the position of one of the society's "Benefactors in Perpetuity".

Research at Simla formally began in 1950. Beebe's research at Simla combined elements of many different earlier stages of his research, including observations of the life cycles of the area's birds, detailed analyses of every plant and animal in small areas of forest, and studies of insect behavior. Insects were the focus of the scientific papers he produced during this period, marking a transition from his past areas of study into the field of entomology. Local children periodically brought animal specimens to Beebe at Simla and asked him to classify them. Remembering the early studies of his own childhood, in which he had brought specimens to the American Museum of Natural History, he was happily working with them.

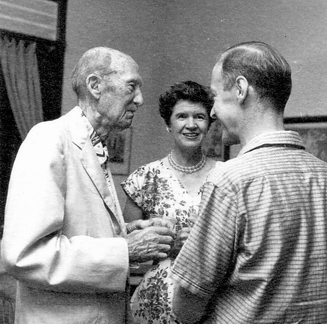
William Beebe, Jocelyn Crane, and Beebe's physician A. E. Hill at Simla in 1959

In 1952, on his seventy-fifth birthday, Beebe retired from his position as the director of the NYZS's Department of Zoological Society and became Director Emeritus, while Jocelyn Crane was promoted to Assistant Director. In honor of his lifetime of work as a naturalist, Beebe was awarded the Theodore Roosevelt Distinguished Service Medal in 1953. Beebe's last major expedition occurred in 1955, retracing the route he had taken during his pheasant expedition 45 years earlier, with the intention of discovering how the populations he had previously studied were faring in response to human encroachment. Jocelyn accompanied him on this expedition for the purpose of documenting Asia's fiddler crabs. Although Jocelyn's studies during this expedition served as part of the basis for her monograph Fiddler Crabs of the World, Beebe never published the results of his own observations during it.

During Beebe's later years, Simla was an important gathering point for researchers in many other areas of biology. Other biologists who visited to conduct studies there and exchange ideas with Beebe included myrmecologist Ted Schneirla, ethologist Konrad Lorenz, entomologist Lincoln Brower, ethologist Donald Griffin, and ornithologist David Snow. Snow became a regular visitor to Simla, and in return Beebe provided financial assistance for some of Snow's own research. Beebe devised an unusual method for determining how he would react to his visitors at Simla. His terrace there was decorated with statues of characters from Winnie-the-Pooh that had been a gift from A. A. Milne. Visitors who recognized these characters as Milne's creations were greeted by Beebe with enthusiasm, while those who did not recognize them were just endured by Beebe until they left.

Beebe remained active well into his old age. In 1957, at the age of eighty, he was still capable of climbing slippery tree trunks to study bird nests. However, by 1959 his strength had lessened enough that long hikes and tree climbing were no longer practical for him, and he contented himself with work that could be conducted in the laboratory, such as dissecting birds' nests to analyze their method of construction. Beebe also began to be afflicted with a throat ailment which may have been Sjögren's syndrome, although lacking a complete understanding of what caused it, Beebe and his doctors referred to it as "mango mouth". Beebe was reluctant to accept speaking engagements because of the effect this had on his voice, although he continued to give lectures on occasion with Jocelyn's help.

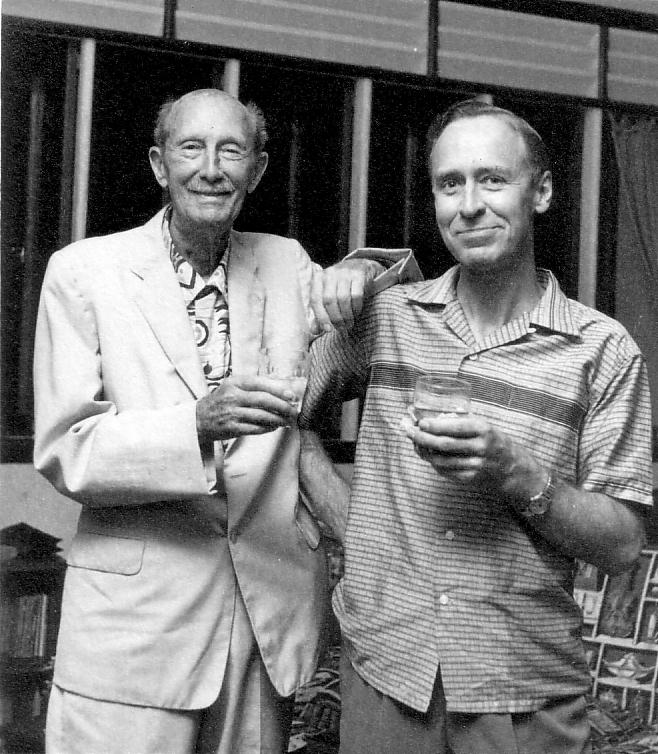
William Beebe and A.E. Hill in 1959

In an account of his final meeting with Beebe, Henry Fairfield Osborn, Jr. describes how during Beebe's last few years he gradually succumbed to illness, eventually becoming nearly immobile and incapable of speech. However, Beebe's personal physician A. E. Hill provides a differing account, stating that Beebe remained lucid and able to move about without assistance almost until his last day, apart from the periods of time during which his "mango mouth" temporarily slurred his speech. Both accounts agree that throughout his final years Beebe remained fond of playing practical jokes on his visitors at Simla, and retained his sense of humor even within days of his death.

William Beebe died of pneumonia at Simla on June 4, 1962. According to his wishes, he was buried in Mucurapo Cemetery in Port of Spain. Memorial services were held in both Trinidad and Tobago and New York City so that Beebe's friends in both parts of the world could attend. Following Beebe's death, Jocelyn succeeded him as the director of the Department of Tropical Research and continued to run the Simla station along with the rest of Beebe's former staff.

Beebe had frequently worried that Elswyth would write a biography of him after his death. To prevent this possibility, he left all of his papers and journals to Jocelyn. After Elswyth died in 1984, Jocelyn donated Beebe's papers to the Department of Rare Books and Special Collections at Princeton University's Firestone Library. Even in the possession of Firestone Library, Beebe's papers remained inaccessible without Jocelyn's permission, and most scholars were prevented from using them until Jocelyn offered access to the writer, Carol Grant Gould, to write Beebe's biography. The Archives of the Wildlife Conservation Society also holds several collections related to the Department of Tropical Research.

== Personality and cultural image ==
A caricature of William Beebe by Miguel Covarrubias, published in Vanity Fair in 1933. The illustration's caption reads "Professor Beebe, gourmet, and ichthyologist, secretly fries his discovery instead of pickling it for posterity."

William Beebe was more famous in the United States than any other American naturalist before the days of television. As a scientific writer who participated in both the popular and academic worlds, he occupied a similar role to the role later occupied by Stephen Jay Gould. Beebe was a well-known figure in the Roaring Twenties of New York City and was friends with numerous other well-known figures of the period, including Fannie Hurst and the cartoonist Rube Goldberg. Although he was not physically handsome in the traditional sense, he tended to dominate every social and professional situation due to his enthusiasm, intelligence, and charisma. As a result of his much-publicized divorce from Blair and his later marriage to Elswyth, he was also known for his stormy relationships with women.

Beebe described his religious beliefs as a combination of Presbyterianism and Buddhism. His religion was largely the result of seeking to combine his sense of awe and wonder at the natural world with a scientific understanding of its workings. He was highly critical of efforts to use science to justify political ideologies, such as socialism or the belief that women were inferior to men. Beebe also disapproved of the eugenic ideas advocated by many biologists in the early 20th century, including some of his contemporaries at the zoo, although this was largely out of fear that these ideas would alienate friends of the zoo and cause divisions among its staff.

Beebe had a troubled relationship with some of his superiors at the zoo, particularly Hornaday, who was resentful of Beebe's constant demands for more funding and staff, as well as the fact that as Beebe's career progressed he gradually devoted less and less time to care for the zoo itself. One particular point of disagreement was Beebe's forgetfulness about returning books which he had borrowed from the Zoological Society's Library, which would occasionally go missing for years as a result. However, Hornaday never publicly expressed his disagreements with Beebe and did not hesitate to defend Beebe's work when others criticized it.

Beebe had high expectations of the people working under him on all of his expeditions, although he never revealed the exact characteristics that he looked for in potential employees. Henry Fairfield Osborn Jr. recounts one incident in which Beebe turned down a scientist who wished to work with him when the scientist described boredom with his current duties as one of his reasons for requesting this. In response to this request, Beebe retorted:

Boredom is immoral. All a man has to do is see. All about us, nature puts on the most thrilling adventure stories ever created, but we have to use our eyes. I was walking across our compound last month when a queen termite began building her miraculous city. I saw it because I was looking down. One night three giant fruit bats flew over the face of the moon. I saw them because I was looking up. To some men, the jungle is a tangled place of heat and danger. But, to the man who can see, its vines and plants form a beautiful and carefully ordered tapestry. No, I don't want any bored men around me.

Beebe nonetheless exhibited a high degree of loyalty to those employees who were capable of meeting his standards. When he felt that the pressure of working under him had become too great, he would announce that his birthday was approaching, and his staff would have several days free from work to celebrate it. On one such occasion, when a scientist working under Beebe whispered to him that he knew it was not in fact Beebe's birthday, Beebe responded "A man should have a birthday when he needs one".

== Impact of work and legacy ==
William Beebe was a pioneer in the field now known as ecology. His theory that organisms must be understood in the context of the ecosystems they inhabit was completely new for its time and has been highly influential. The method he invented of methodically analyzing all organisms within a small area of wilderness has become a standard method in this field. Beebe was also a pioneer in the field of oceanography, setting a precedent with his Bathysphere dives which many other researchers would follow.

E. O. Wilson, Sylvia Earle and Ernst Mayr have all described Beebe's work as an influence on their own choice of careers. Among the most significant of Beebe's influences on other researchers was Rachel Carson, who regarded Beebe as both a friend and an inspiration. Carson dedicated her 1951 book The Sea Around Us to Beebe, writing "My absorption in the mystery and meaning of the sea have been stimulated and the writing of this book aided by the friendship and encouragement of William Beebe." Due to Beebe's renewed emphasis on field research at a time when laboratory studies were becoming the dominant trend in biology, more recent field researchers such as Jane Goodall and George Schaller are also sometimes considered his intellectual descendants.

By writing for a scientific as well as the popular audience, Beebe did much to make science accessible to the general public. This was particularly significant in the area of conservation, of which he was one of the most important early advocates. With his many writings about the dangers of environmental destruction, Beebe helped to raise public awareness about this topic. However, Beebe's prolific writing for a popular audience had a downside, in that other scientists of his time were reluctant to hold him in high accord because they regarded him as a popularizer.

During the course of his career, Beebe authored over 800 articles and 21 books, including his four-volume pheasant monograph. He had a total of 64 animals named after him, and he described one new species of bird and 87 species of fish (see Category:Taxa named by William Beebe). While 83 of the fish that he described were done so in a conventional manner, the remaining four were done so based on visual observations.

A lingering controversy exists in ichthyology over the validity of the four species Beebe described based on visual descriptions only, which he had observed during his Bathysphere dives. The naming of a new species ordinarily requires obtaining and analyzing a type specimen, something which was obviously impossible from inside the Bathysphere. Some of Beebe's critics claimed that these fish were illusions resulting from condensation on the Bathysphere's window, or even that Beebe willfully made them up, although the latter would have been strongly at odds with Beebe's reputation as an honest and rigorous scientist. While many of Beebe's observations from the Bathysphere have since been confirmed by advances in undersea photography, it is unclear whether others fit the description of any known sea animal. One possibility is that although these animals indeed exist, so much remains to be discovered about life in the deep ocean that these animals have yet to be seen by anyone other than him.

In addition to his descriptions of new taxa, the crab Leptuca beebei (Crane, 1941), commonly known as Beebe's fiddler crab, was named in his honor.

=== Tetrapteryx ===
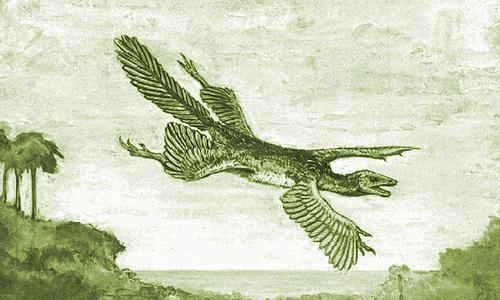
Beebe's illustration of "Tetrapteryx"

Along with his analysis of pheasant phylogeny and his studies of life in the Galápagos Islands, Beebe regarded one of his most important contributions to the field of evolutionary biology to be his hypothesis that the ancestors of birds passed through what he referred to as a “Tetrapteryx stage”, with wings on both their front and hind limbs. Beebe based this theory on his observation that the hatchlings and embryos of some modern birds possess long quill feathers on their legs, which he regarded as an atavism; he also noticed vestiges of leg-wings on one of the specimens of Archaeopteryx. Beebe described his idea in a 1915 paper published in Zoologica, titled "A Tetrapteryx Stage in the Ancestry of Birds".

Gerhard Heilmann discussed Beebe's Tetrapteryx hypothesis at considerable length in his 1926 book The Origin of Birds. Heilmann examined hatchlings of many other bird species, both closely related to those studied by Beebe and belonging to more primitive species, in hope of finding additional evidence for the leg-wings which Beebe had documented. After failing to find such evidence, Heilmann ultimately rejected Beebe's Tetrapteryx hypothesis, and this remained the consensus among ornithologists for the next several decades. Beebe, however, continued to advance his Tetrapteryx hypothesis as late as the 1940s.

In 2003, Beebe's Tetrapteryx hypothesis was supported by the discovery of Microraptor gui, a small feathered dinosaur which possessed asymmetrical flight feathers on both its front and hind limbs. Beebe's Tetrapteryx hypothesis is now regarded as prescient for its prediction of both the anatomy and likely gliding posture of Microraptor gui, which Richard O. Prum has described as "[looking] as if it could have glided straight out of the pages of Beebe’s notebooks." This animal's discovery has had the effect of resurrecting Beebe's theory that leg feathers played an important role in the origin of bird flight.

=== William Beebe Tropical Research Station ===
Following William Beebe's death in 1962, his research station at Simla remained in operation under Jocelyn Crane's management, under the new name of the William Beebe Tropical Research Station. However, because Jocelyn's research required her to travel north for extended periods, by 1965 she had little time to keep the station running. By 1971, the station had fallen into disuse and was declared closed. Meanwhile, as Asa Wright's health began to fail in her old age, her friends began to fear that after her death her neighboring estate of Spring Hill might be lost to developers and established a trust to buy the estate and convert it into the Asa Wright nature center. In 1974, Beebe's property was donated to the newly established Asa Wright Nature Center.

Now under the management of the Asa Wright Nature Center, the William Beebe Tropical Research Station has gradually been renovated. It is now once again actively involved in research and an important gathering place for scientists. It is also a popular destination for birdwatchers, who can observe the same populations of hummingbirds, tanagers and oilbirds that William Beebe studied decades earlier.
