= Hypothetical species =

Postulated extinct species without evidence

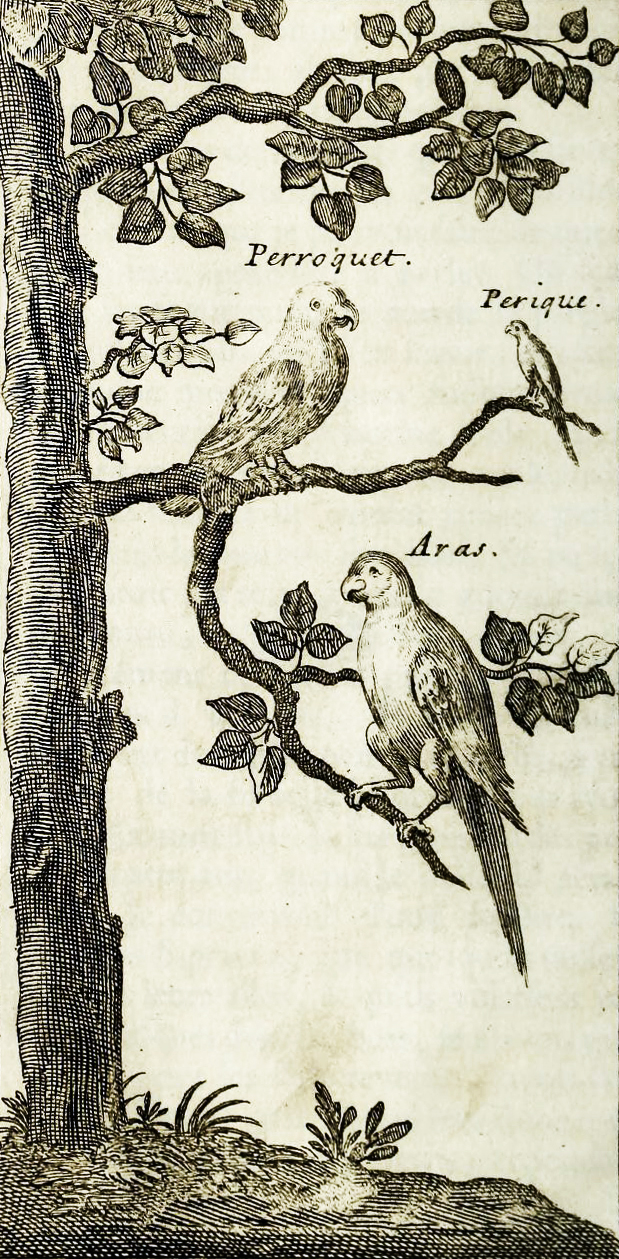
A 1722 illustration by Jean-Baptiste Labat of three parrots on Guadeloupe. There are no remains of these species, so accurate taxonomic classification is impossible.

Several species have been assumed to exist, but due to a lack of physical evidence they can only be regarded as hypothetical or potential species. Hypothetical species are usually believed to be extinct. They have caused confusion, as they may have been a separate species, a subspecies, an introduced species or a misidentification. It can also refer to species that are hypothesised to have existed evolutionarily.

== List of hypothetical species ==
=== Birds ===
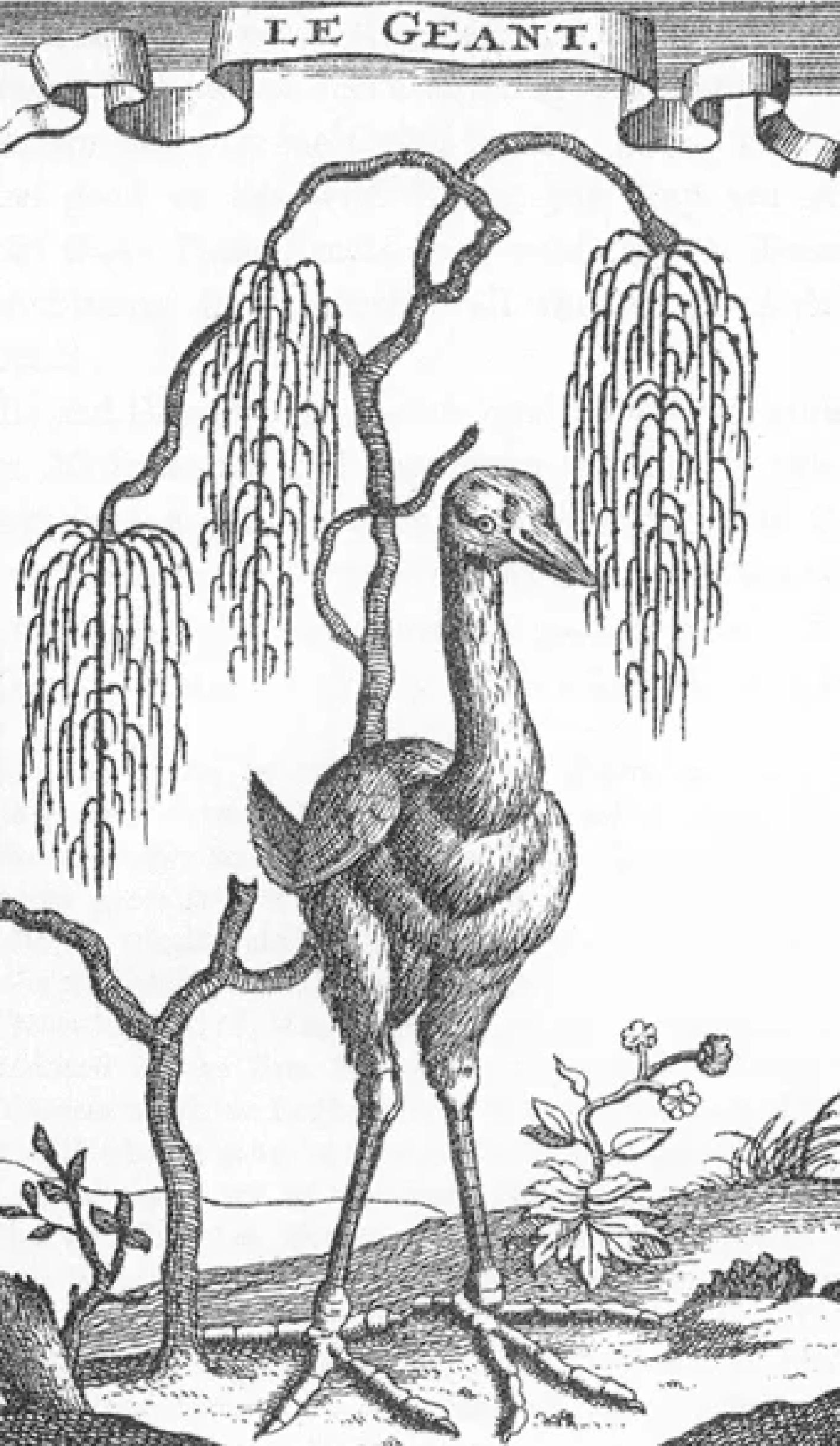
Illustration of "Leguat's giant", a bird from Mauritius now believed by some researchers to be based on sightings of the greater flamingo

- Albin's macaw
- Arkansaw siskin, Fringilla spaltria
- Barraband's mystery black-breasted twelve-wired bird-of-paradise
- Bird of Washington, Haliaetus washingtoni
- Blue-browed fig parrot
- Blue Mountain warbler, Sylvia montana
- Blue-thighed lory, Lorius tibialis
- Dominican green-and-yellow macaw, Ara atwoodi
- Carbonated warbler, Sylvia carbonata
- Cuvier's kinglet, Regulus cuvieri
- Geoffroyus aureus
- Guadeloupe amazon, Amazona violacea
- Guadeloupe parakeet, Psittacara labati
- Hypothetical relatives of the Rodrigues parrot
- Jago fowl, Gallus giganteus
- Jamaican red macaw, Ara gossei
- Leguat's giant, Leguatia gigantea
- Lesser Antillean macaw, Ara guadeloupensis
- Madeira finch, Goniaphea leucocephala
- Martinique amazon, Amazona martinicana
- Martinique macaw, Ara martinicus
- Meidum geese
- Painted vulture, Sarcoramphus sacra/Sarcoramphus papa ssp.
- Raiatea starling, Aplonis? ulietensis
- Red-headed macaw, Ara erythrocephala
- Roper River scrub robin, Drymodes superciliaris colcloughi
- Réunion swamphen, Porphyrio caerulescens
- Small-headed flycatcher, Muscicapa minuta
- Sushkin's goose, Anser neglectus
- Tahiti crake, Zapornia nigra
- Tanna ground dove, Pampusana ferruginea
- Townsends' dickcissel or Townsend's finch, Spiza townsendi (originally Emberiza townsendi)
- Unicolored lory, Eos unicolor
- Unidentified Jamaican parrot
- Zhenniao

=== Non-avian dinosaurs ===
- Proavis (partim)

=== Mammals ===
- Andean wolf, Dasycyon hagenbecki
- Chilihueque, Lama araucana
- Chinese elephant, Elephas maximus rubridens
- Giraffa sahara
- Javan elephant, Elephas maximus sondaicus
- Kallana
- Long-necked seal, Phoca mutica
- Shrewdinger
- Sonnerat's shrew, Diplomesodon sonnerati
- Steller's sea ape, Simia marina
- Sumxu
- Unidentified extinct canid populations
- Waitoreke
- Zebro

=== Fish ===
- Abyssal rainbow gar
- Five-lined constellation fish, Bathysidus pentagrammus
- Giant dragonfish, Bathysphaera intacta
- Pallid sailfin, Bathyembryx istiophasma
- Three-starred anglerfish, Bathyceratias trilynchnus

=== Arthropods ===
- Acarus crossi
- Battus polydamas antiquus

=== Other invertebrates ===
- Thermozodium esakii
- Porpita prunella
- Salinella salve

=== Plants ===
- Laysan fan palm, Pritchardia? sp.
- Silphium

=== Other organisms ===
- Last universal common ancestor

== See also ==
- Chimera
- Cryptozoology
- Species inquirenda
