= Chilihueque =

- Chilihueque depicted in a 1646 book about the Dutch expedition to Valdivia

Conservation status
- Extinct

Scientific classification
- Kingdom: Animalia
- Phylum: Chordata
- Class: Mammalia
- Infraclass: Placentalia
- Order: Artiodactyla
- Family: Camelidae
- Genus: Lama
- Species: †L. araucana

Binomial name
- †Lama araucana (Molina, 1782)

Synonyms
- Camelus araucanus Molina, 1782; Lama chilihueque Boitard, 1841

Extinct hypothetical species of mammal

The chilihueque/chiliweke or hueque/weke (Lama araucana) is an extinct hypothetical species of South American camelid. It lived in central and southern Chile until the colonial period.

== Taxonomy ==
The chilihueque was first scientifically described by Juan Ignacio Molina in 1782, who named it Camelus araucanus. In 1829, Johann Baptist Fischer reassigned the species to Lama. Pierre Boitard proposed the alternate name Lama chilihueque in 1841. There are two main hypotheses for its origin: the first suggests that it was a locally-domesticated guanaco and the second that it was a llama or alpaca introduced from the north. The former hypothesis is supported by a mitochondrial DNA analysis of bones from Mocha Island.

== Description ==
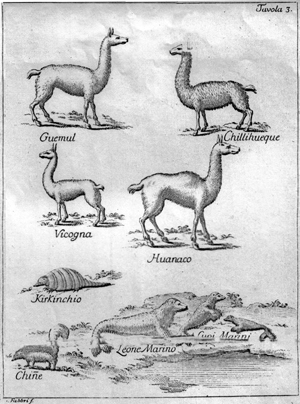
1776 illustration of various lamines, including the chilihueque at top right

According to Molina, Joris van Spilbergen observed the Mapuche of Mocha Island using chilihueques as plough animals. They were also ritually slaughtered by the Mapuche, as attested by various 16th century Spanish records. White individuals were reserved for dignitaries, while those of other colors were shared with commoners (including for the purpose of bride prices). Chilihueque populations declined through the 16th and 17th centuries, becoming outnumbered by sheep and other livestock brought by Europeans. The exact date of their extinction is uncertain, but it was likely in the late 18th century. At this time, only the Mapuche in Huequén (near Angol) and Mariquina still raised the species according to Tomás Guevara.
