= Madeira finch =

Extinct species of bird

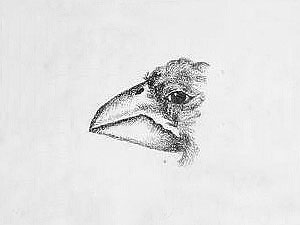
Only live depiction (1823).

The Madeira finch (Goniaphea leucocephala) is a hypothetical species of recently extinct small passerine bird from the Portuguese archipelago of Madeira, which is biogeographically part of Macaronesia. It should not be confused with the extant Madeira chaffinch (Fringilla maderensis).

== Discovery ==
The only known account is the 1823 description and illustration of a bird by British author Thomas Edward Bowdich, published by his widow Sarah Bowdich Lee in the 1825 book Excursions in Madeira and Porto Santo, during the autumn of 1823, while on his third voyage to Africa. No remains of this bird survive; if collected it was probably lost while en route to Europe, as happened to most of Bowdich's specimens.

== Description ==
Bowdich's original text and footnote read:

I saw another and more curious bird, but I doubt if it is a native of the island. The outline of the beak most resembles that of the widow-bird, (vidua, Cuv.) but the commisure is situated like that of the grakle, (gracula, Cuv.) immediately beneath the nostril, and forms a much deeper angle; it evidently belongs to the goniaphea, between fringilla and corythrus.

The upper mandible closes over the lower, and the middle toe is longer than the others; the whole bird is black, with the exception of the head, which is azure. G. leucocephala.

== Taxonomy ==
Bowdich's concern that G. leucocephala might not be native to Madeira was echoed by other authors that placed it on the New World genus Passerina rather than the Fringillidae sensu stricto. However this was rejected as implausible by Harald Pieper in 1985. Pieper found abundant subfossil remains of fringillids in Madeira, which included at least one clearly new species of the genus Acanthis or a close relative. But despite noting Bowdich's account and supporting its interpretation as belonging to an endemic, recently extinct fringillid from Madeira, he refrained from assigning any remains to this species.

== Extinction ==
No similar bird was seen or described again, so the species must have disappeared before Richard Thomas Lowe surveyed Madeira and Porto Santo in 1853. It could have disappeared due to human alteration of its habitat or introduced predators. The natural vegetation of the islands was considerably altered after settlement began in 1420, particularly in the lowlands, which caused the extinction of several bird species including flightless rails and quails. By 1859, Charles Darwin noted that the islands were strangely devoid of endemic species. Pieper, who studied pre-settlement bird remains from Madeira and Porto Santo in the 1980s, found that many actually belonged to extinct endemics, while songbirds presently common in Madeira like the common linnet and European goldfinch were absent. This supports the idea that the native avifauna of the islands largely became extinct as a result of human activity and was replaced by species from the continent.
