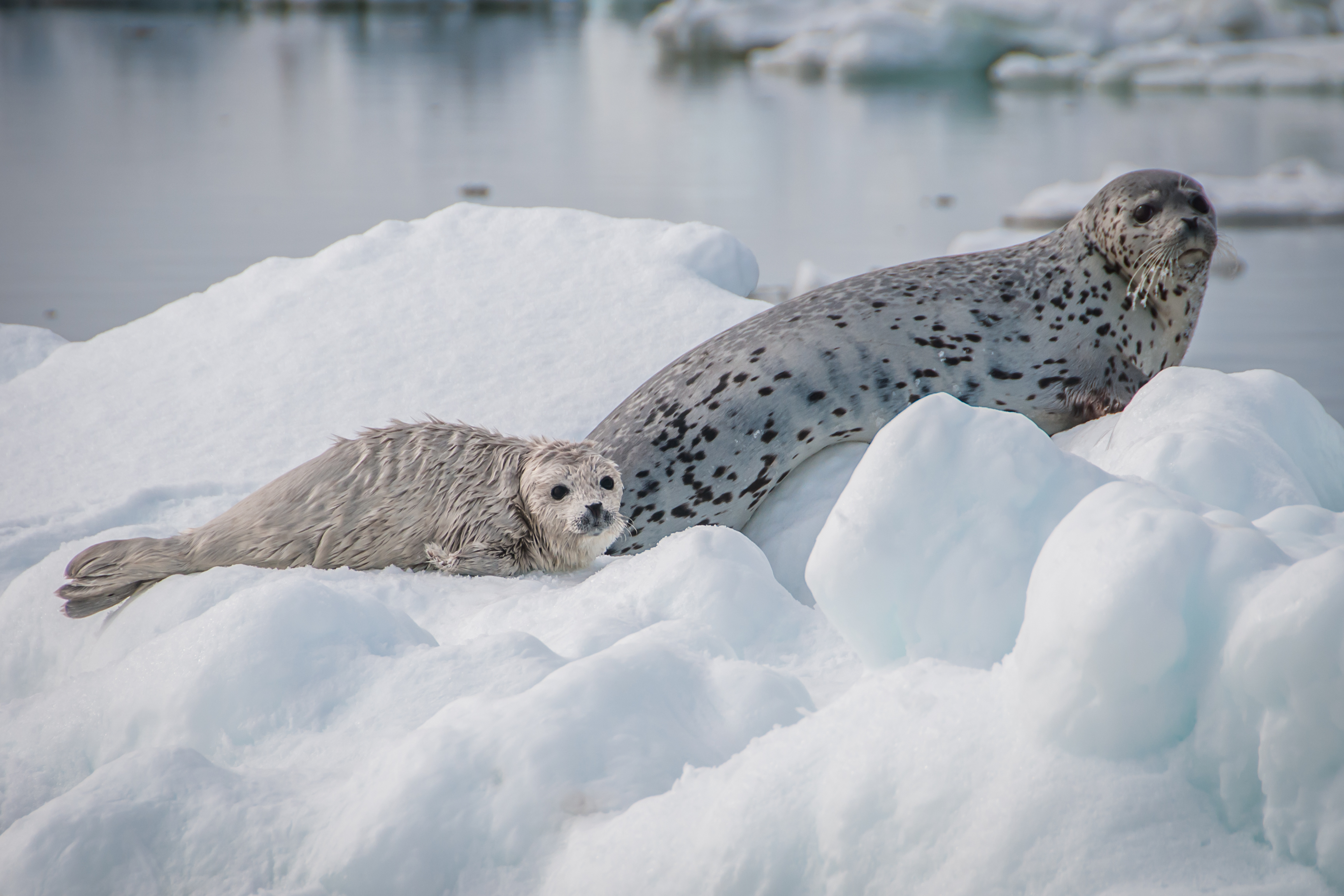
- Spotted seal mother and pup in the Bering Sea

Conservation status
- Least Concern (IUCN 3.1)

Scientific classification
- Kingdom: Animalia
- Phylum: Chordata
- Class: Mammalia
- Order: Carnivora
- Parvorder: Pinnipedia
- Family: Phocidae
- Genus: Phoca
- Species: P. largha

Binomial name
- Phoca largha Pallas, 1811
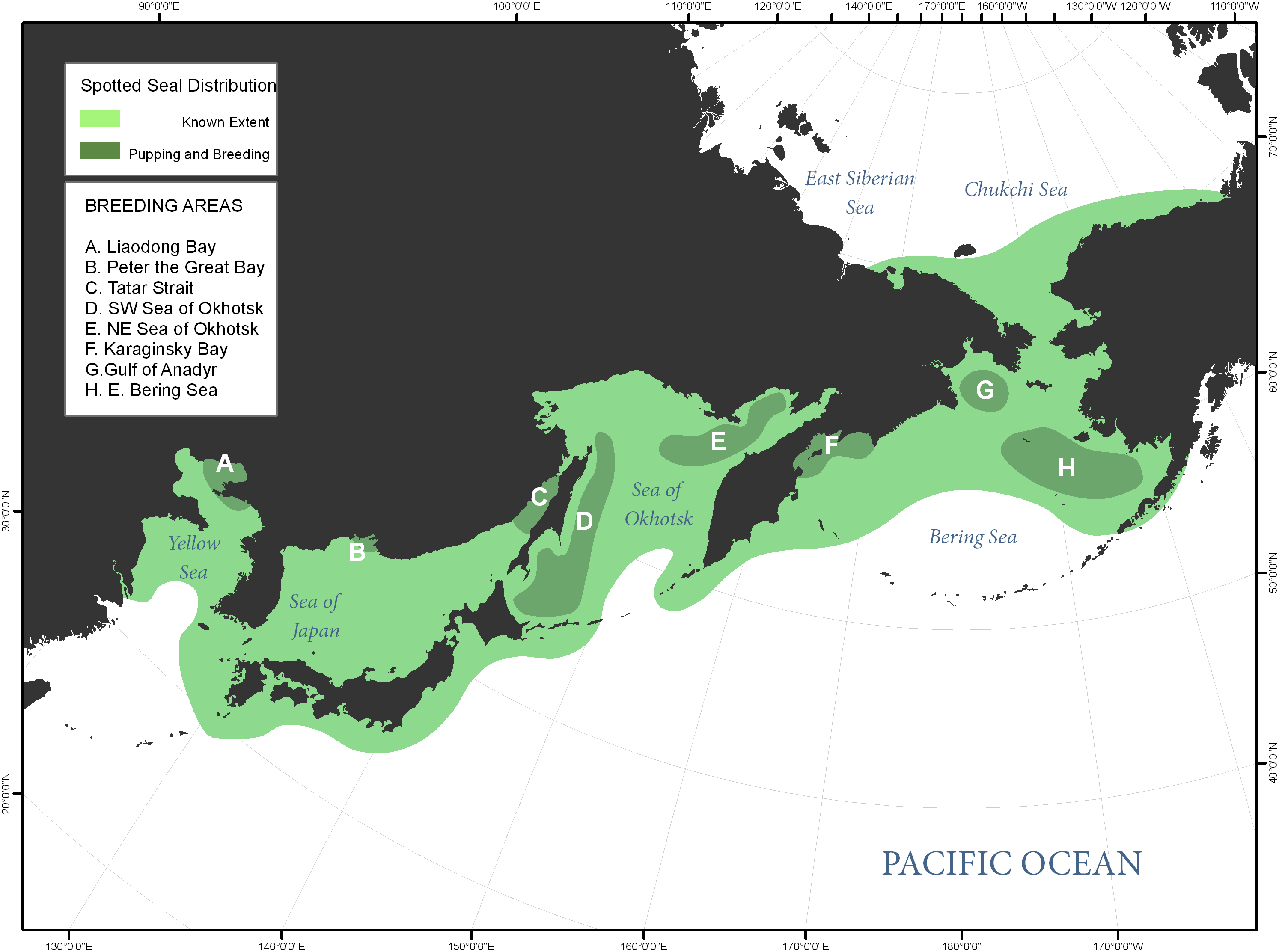
- Spotted seal distribution

= Spotted seal =

Species of mammal

The spotted seal (Phoca largha), also known as the larga seal or largha seal, is a species of earless seal (or true seal, Phocidae). It inhabits ice floes and waters of the north Pacific Ocean and adjacent seas. It is primarily found along the continental shelf of the Beaufort, Chukchi, Bering and Okhotsk Seas and south to the northern Yellow Sea and it migrates south as far as northern Huanghai and the western Sea of Japan. It is also found in Alaska from the southeastern Bristol Bay to Demarcation Point during the ice-free seasons of summer and autumn when spotted seals mate and have pups. Smaller numbers are found in the Beaufort Sea. It is sometimes mistaken for the harbor seal to which it is closely related and spotted seals and harbor seals often mingle together in areas where their habitats overlap.

The reduction in arctic ice floes due to global warming led to concerns that the spotted seal was threatened with extinction. Studies were conducted on its population numbers, with the conclusion, as of 15 October 2009, that the spotted seal population in Alaskan waters is not currently to be listed as endangered by NOAA. However, as of 2026, the NOAA considers the distinct population group of southern spotted seals to be threatened.

== Etymology ==
The scientific name originated in the Greek word for seal, phoce, and larga, the term used by the Siberian Tungus people for this seal. The English common name comes from this seal's characteristic dark, irregularly shaped spots. In Alaska, indigenous names include issuriq in Central Alaskan Yup'ik, gazigyaq in St. Lawrence Island Yupik, and qasigiaq in Inupiaq.

== Description ==
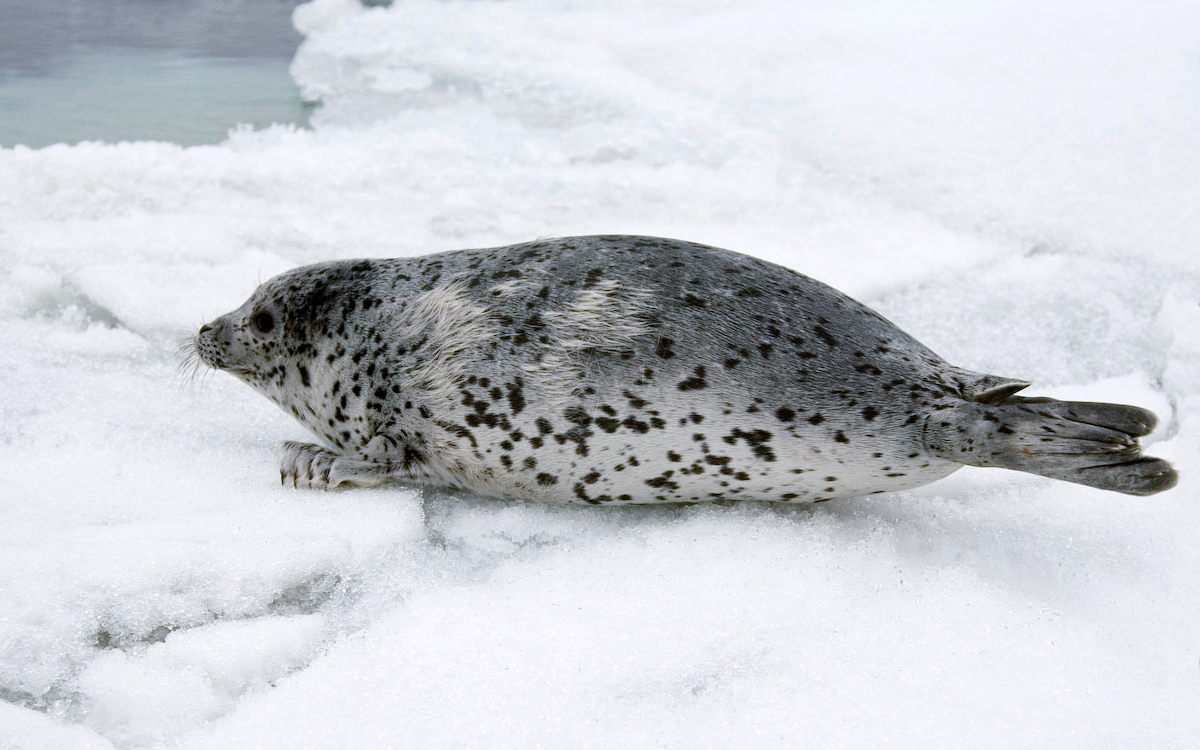
Juvenile spotted seal in the Bering Sea, with some of its white lanugo fur remaining

The spotted seal is of the family, Phocidae, or "true seals". Compared to other true seals, they are intermediate in size, with mature adults of both sexes generally weighing between 82–109 kg (180–240 lb) and measuring 150–210 cm (59–83 in), roughly the same size as a harbor seal or ribbon seal. The head of a spotted seal is round, with a narrow snout resembling that of a dog.

The spotted seal has a relatively small body and short flippers extending behind the body that provide thrust, while the small flippers in front act as rudders. The dense fur varies in color from silver to gray and white and is characterized by dark, irregular spots against the lighter background and covering the entire body. Males and females differ little in size or shape. In places where their habitat overlaps with that of the harbor seal, they can be confused with them, as in Bristol Bay, Alaska. Like harbor seals, spotted seals have 34 teeth. Spotted seal pups are born with a white natal coat (called lanugo) that is typically shed by the time they are weaned.

== Distribution and habitat ==
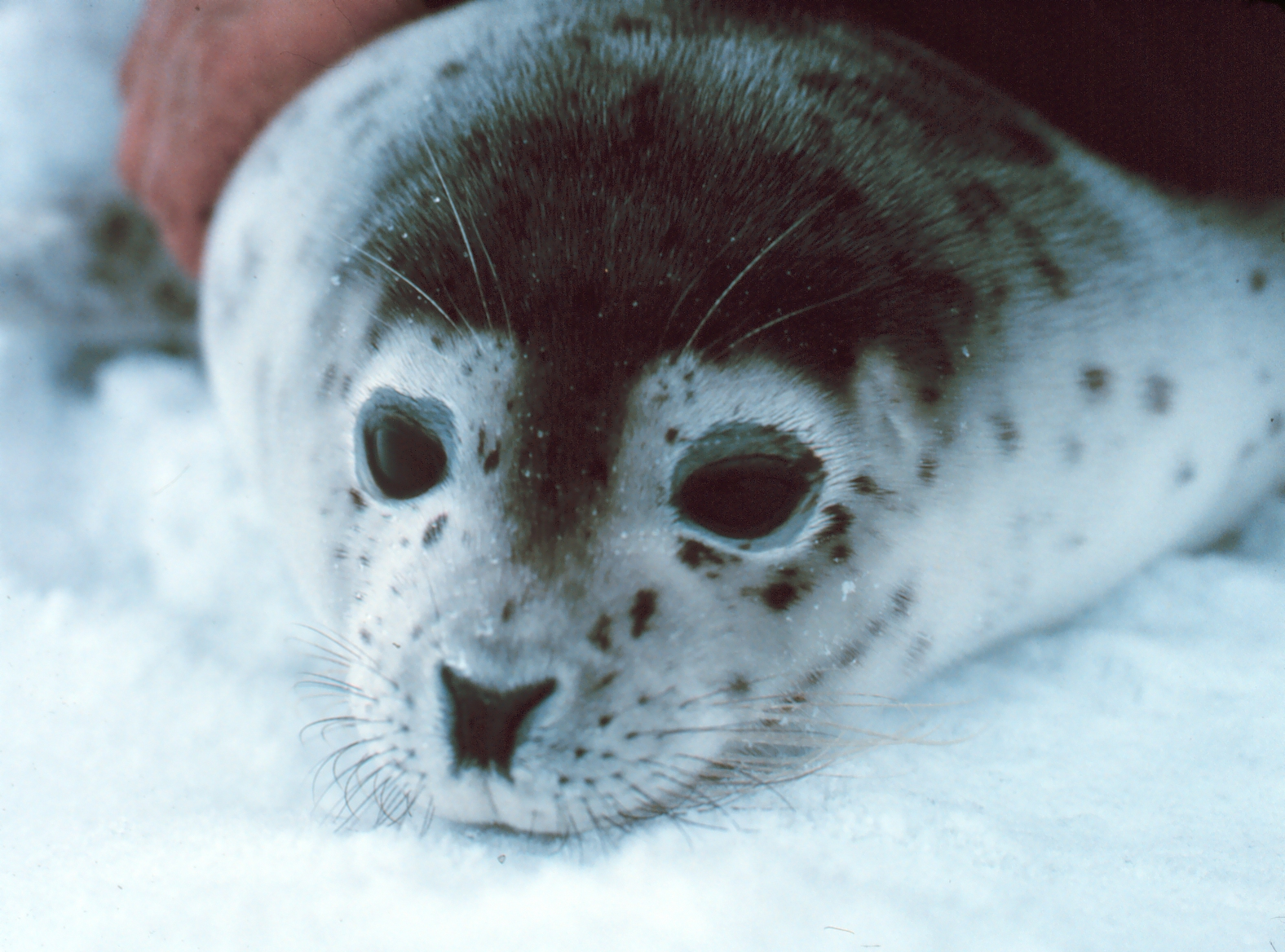
Spotted seal showing narrow snout like that of a dog

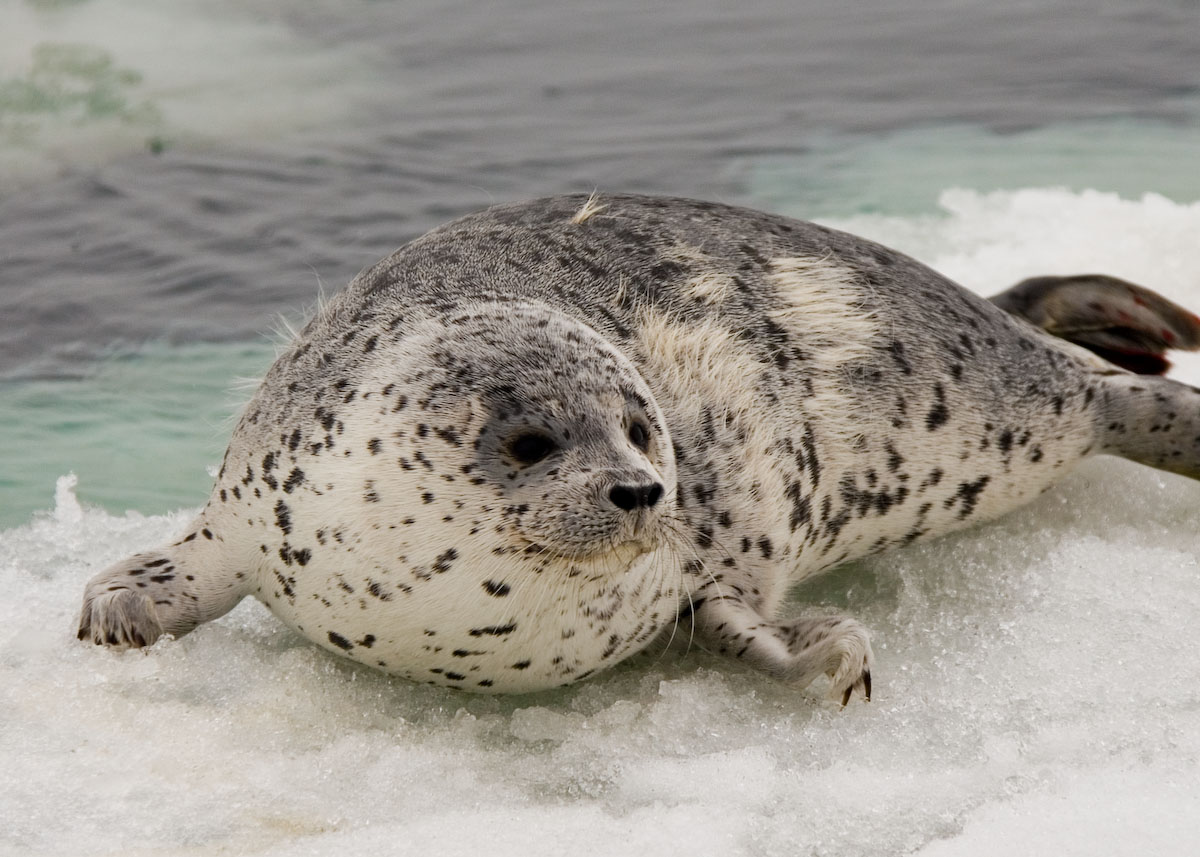
Juvenile spotted Seal in Bering Sea, Alaska, in the process of shedding its lanugo

Spotted seals are inhabitants of arctic or sub-arctic waters, often in the outer areas of ice floes during the breeding season. They tend not to live within dense drift ice. In the summer months they live in the open ocean or on nearby shores.

Spotted seals are separated into three populations. The Bering Sea population includes approximately 100,000 in the western Bering Sea near Kamchatka, in the Gulf of Anadyr in Russia, and in the eastern Bering Sea in Alaskan waters (the only population in the US). A second population of about 100,000 seals breeds in the Sea of Japan and the Sea of Okhotsk. A third population of about 3,300 seals is to the south in Liaodong Bay, China and Peter the Great Bay, Russia. There is also a smaller population of 300 spotted seals living in waters off Baekryeong Island located far north of the west coast of South Korea. The populations of spotted seal fluctuate, migration to other areas, and breeding seasons impact this.

== Behavior and reproduction ==
Spotted seals are relatively shy and are difficult for humans to approach. They can be solitary in general but are gregarious and form large groups during pupping and molting seasons when they haul out on ice floes or, if lacking ice, on land. The numerically largest groups in Alaska are at Kasegaluk Lagoon in the Chukchi Sea, near Cape Espenburg in Kotzebue Sound, and in Kuskokwim Bay on sandbars and shoals, where several thousand may collect.

Sexual maturity is attained around the age of four. January to mid-April is the breeding season. Pup births peak in mid-March. Spotted seals are believed annually monogamous, and during breeding season, they form "families" made up of a male, female, and their pup, born after a 10-month gestation period. Average birth size is 100 cm (39 in) and 12 kg (26 lb). Pups are weaned six weeks later. The maximum lifespan of the spotted seal is 35 years with few living beyond 25.

Spotted seals dive to depths up to 300 m (980 ft) while feeding on a variety of ocean prey. Juveniles eat primarily krill and small crustaceans while adults eat a variety of fish including herring, Arctic cod, Pacific cod, pollock, and capelin, as well as mollusks and crustaceans. They do not seem to vocalize a lot, although not much is known about their vocalizations. They appear to vocalize more while in molting groups. When approached in these groups, they make various sounds such as growls, barks, moans, and roars.

Based on satellite tracking conducted on Yellow Sea population, it was revealed that seals migrate more than 3,300 km (2,100 mi).

== Conservation status ==
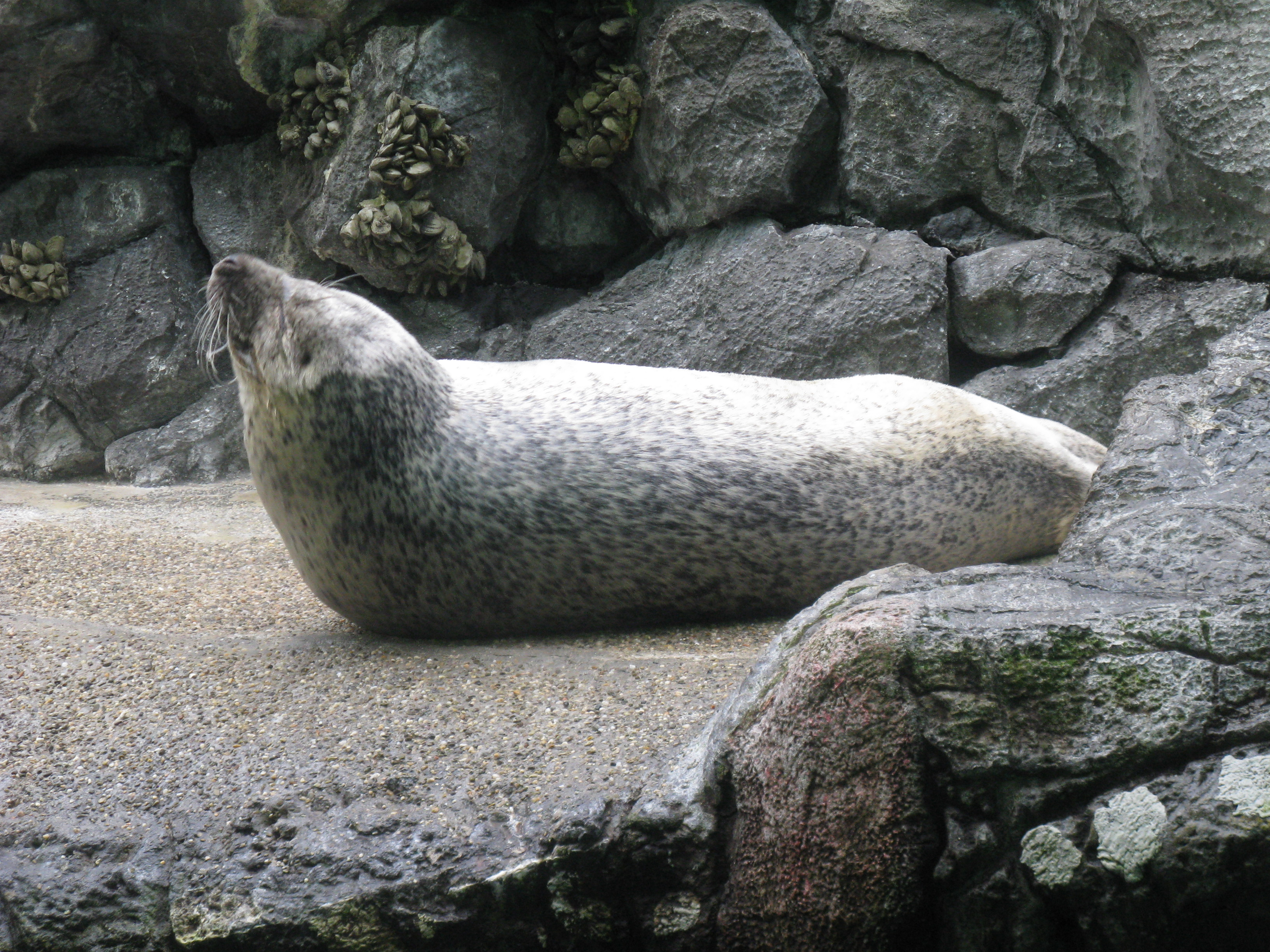
Spotted seal in captivity

On 28 March 2008, the U.S. National Oceanic and Atmospheric Administration (NOAA) initiated a status review under the Endangered Species Act (ESA) to determine if listing this ice seal species under the ESA was warranted. After an 18-month review of the status of the spotted seal, NOAA announced on 15 October 2009 that two of the three spotted seal populations, together numbering 200,000 seals in or adjacent to Alaska, are not in danger of becoming extinct, nor are they likely to become so in the "foreseeable future", even though global warming has caused a loss in arctic ice mass. The announcement stated: "We do not predict the expected fluctuations in sea ice will affect them enough to warrant listing at this time." However, a distinct population group of spotted seals off the coast of Russia and China is listed as threatened under the Endangered Species Act. Because they are marine mammals, spotted seals are protected under the Marine Mammal Protection Act.

In China, the spotted seal was placed under class-II national protection starting in 1988, but the protection level was raised to class-I in 2021. The main threats to the species in China are global warming, marine traffic, industry noise, ocean pollution, and poaching for aquarium exhibition.

In South Korea, spotted seals have been designated Natural Monument No. 331 and second-class endangered species. In 2006, the environmental activist group Green Korea United worked closely with local Chinese government to stop the seals from being poached by Chinese fishermen.

== See also ==
- List of pinnipeds
