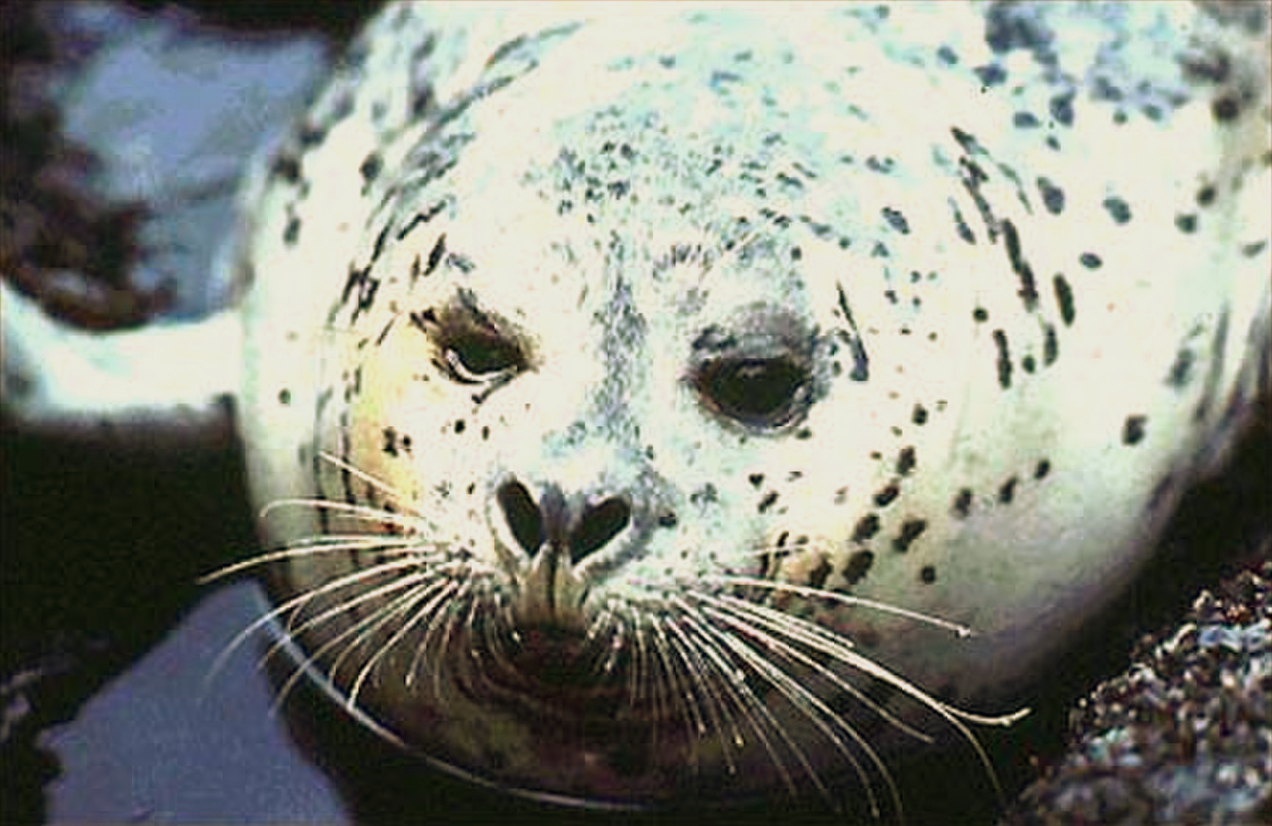

Scientific classification
- Kingdom: Animalia
- Phylum: Chordata
- Class: Mammalia
- Order: Carnivora
- Parvorder: Pinnipedia
- Family: Phocidae
- Subfamily: Phocinae
- Tribe: Phocini
- Genus: Phoca; Linnaeus, 1758

Type species
- Phoca vitulina Linnaeus, 1758

Species
- P. largha; P. vitulina; P. mutica?
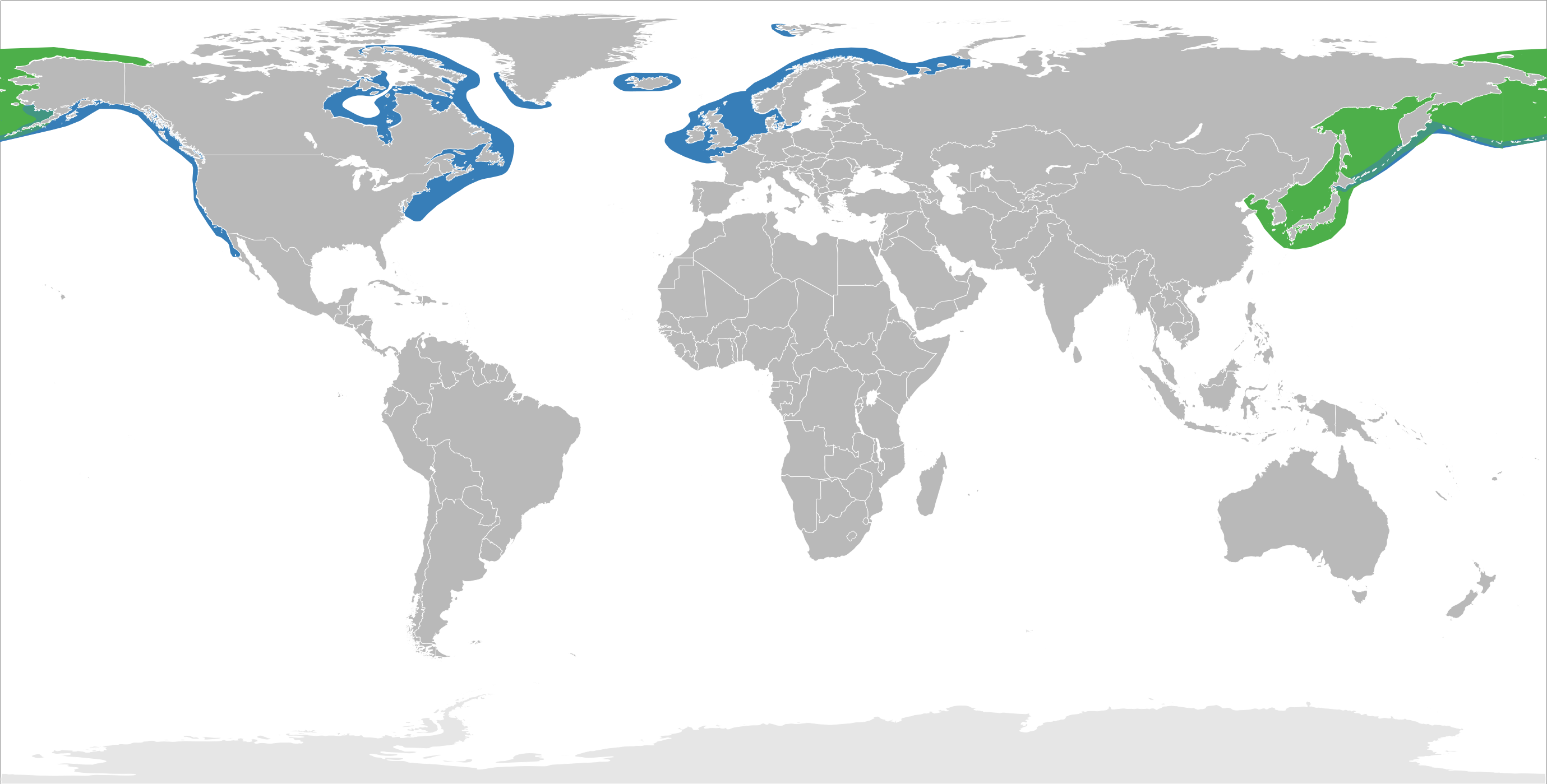
- Phoca distribution. P largha in green, P. vitulina in blue.

= Phoca =

Genus of carnivores

Phoca (/ˈfoʊkə/ FOH-kə) is a genus of the earless seals, (Phocidae). It now contains just two species, the common seal (or harbour seal) and the spotted seal (or largha seal). Several species formerly listed under this genus have been split into the genera Pusa, Pagophilus, and Histriophoca. Until recently, Phoca largha has been considered a subspecies of Phoca vitulina but now is considered its own species. For this reason, the fossil history of the genus is unclear, and it has formerly been used as wastebasket taxon for a number of fossils of uncertain affinity.

== Species ==
Currently there are two confirmed members:

Genus – two species
Common name	Scientific name and subspecies	Range	Size and ecology	IUCN status and estimated population
spotted seal	Phoca largha Pallas, 1811	Beaufort, Chukchi, Bering and Okhotsk Seas	Size: Habitat: Diet:	LC
common seal	Phoca vitulina (Linnaeus, 1758) Five subspecies: P. vitulina concolor (DeKay, 1842); P. vitulina mellonae (Doutt, 1942); P. vitulina richardii (Gray, 1864); P. vitulina stejnegeri (J. A. Allen, 1902); P. vitulina vitulina (Linnaeus, 1758)	northern Atlantic and Pacific Oceans and the Baltic and North Seas	Size: Habitat: Diet:	LC

There is also a third unconfirmed member:

Image	Scientific name	Common name	Distribution
	Phoca mutica	long-necked seal	unknown

Former members of Phoca:

- Histriophoca fasciata (ribbon seal)
- Pusa caspica (Caspian seal)
- Pusa hispida (ringed seal)
- Pusa sibirica (nerpa or Baikal seal)
- Pagophilus groenlandica (harp seal)

== Mating ecology ==
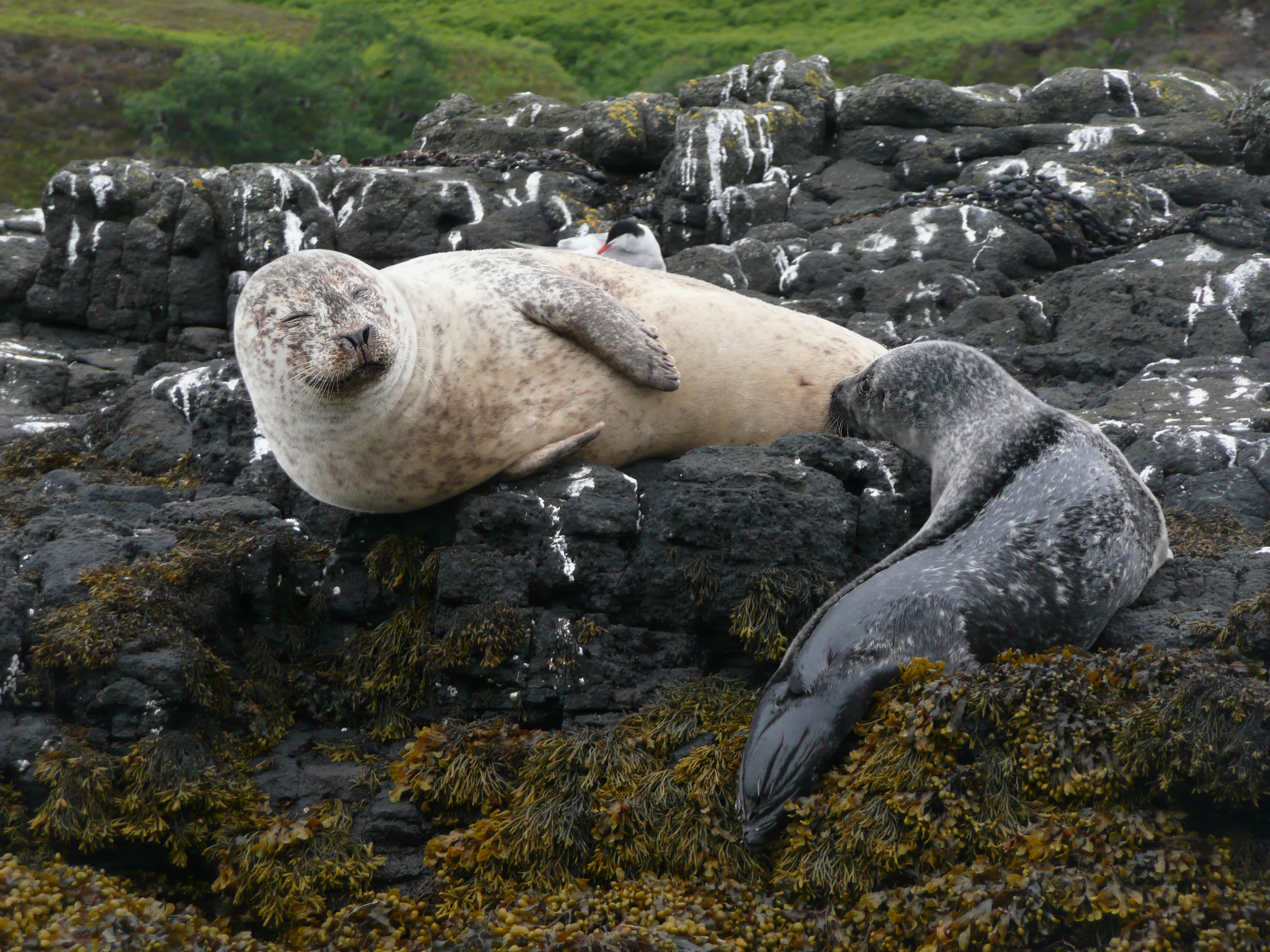
Harbour seal breastfeeding a pup. Shortly after weaning mating will occur.

Both harbour and spotted seals are aquatically mating pinnipeds. Mating occurs in the water around the time when pups are weaned. Females in estrus are typically more dispersed than land-breeding pinnipeds and the distinction between foraging and reproductive behavior is less apparent. For this reason, it is difficult to study the mating patterns of this genus.

Female harbour seals start making foraging trips shortly before weaning their pup and consequently are widely dispersed when in estrus. Males restrict their range around the time females start to make these foraging trips. Harbour seals follow a polygynous mating system. More specifically it has been shown that male harbour seals partake in lek polygyny. Male seals defend underwater territories with well-defined boundaries. The most valuable territories are near haulouts or along traffic corridors that provide maximum exposure to estrous females. One male will occupy an area throughout the breeding season, and they will return to the same display area in consecutive years. Female harbour seals receive direct benefits from being in a lek, as the congregation of males into an area makes mate selection easier because females do not have to travel as far and it also helps to reduce exposure to predators.

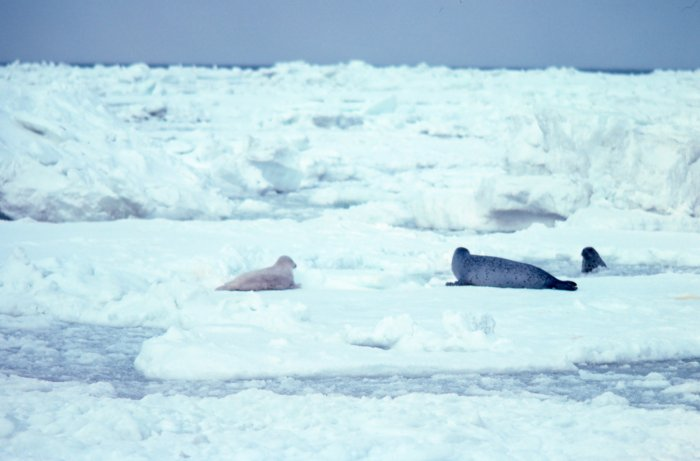
Spotted seal triad during the breeding season: lanugo-clad pup (left), mother (center), and attending male (right in water).

Harbour seal males use underwater vocalizations and display dives within their aquatic territories, for both female attraction and male-male competition. Male harbour seal vocalizations consist of low-frequency broadband growls that peak in occurrence during the mating season. Males vocalize and display in small, distinct territories covering around 40–135 m^{2}. Each display area is spatially discrete and can be separated by up to 250 meters. Male harbour seals have considerable individual and geographic variation in their underwater vocalizations. Territory holders use the acoustic displays of intruders to locate and challenge invaders and will respond aggressively to a male call. Males assess each other by their vocalizations before deciding whether to respond. These vocalizations are energetically expensive to produce and are honest signals of male quality and dominance. Male body condition will decline as the mating season progresses.

Aquatic hierarchies in harbour seals develop before the breeding season and dominance is determined by direct male contests. These contests involve repeated confrontations between two males using surface splashing, fighting, paired somersaulting, and chasing techniques. The hierarchies may aid in holding territories or to mate with females during the breeding season. The dominance relationships are determined by size and sex, with adult males dominant to sub-adult males, and sub-adult females submissive to all other social classes. Aquatic courtship is long in duration and involves rolling, bubble blowing, and splashing to attract females. Female choice appears to play a strong role in this mating system but it has yet to be formally studied.

The mating system of spotted seals is quite different from harbour seals as spotted seals are serially monogamous. During the breeding season, a male will join a female approximately ten days before the female gives birth to a pup from the previous years mating. The pairs are considered to be territorial as they keep widely spaced from other spotted seals. The social group consists of an isolated adult pair and the females pup. The female spotted seal receives direct benefits from the male as he provides protection for her and the pup until it is weaned. Immediately after weaning mating occurs.
