= Gallus giganteus =

Hypothetical species of fowl

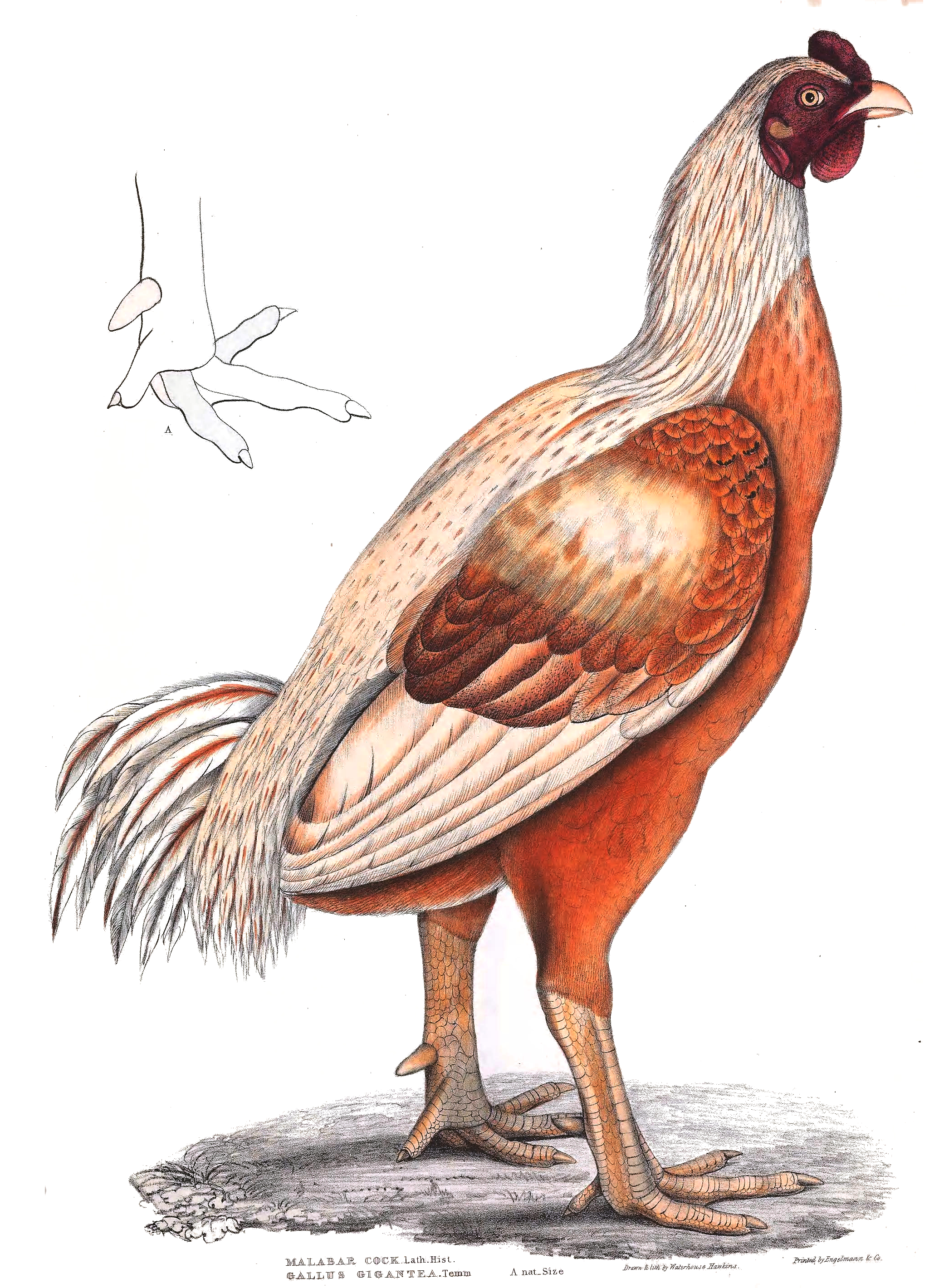
Cock

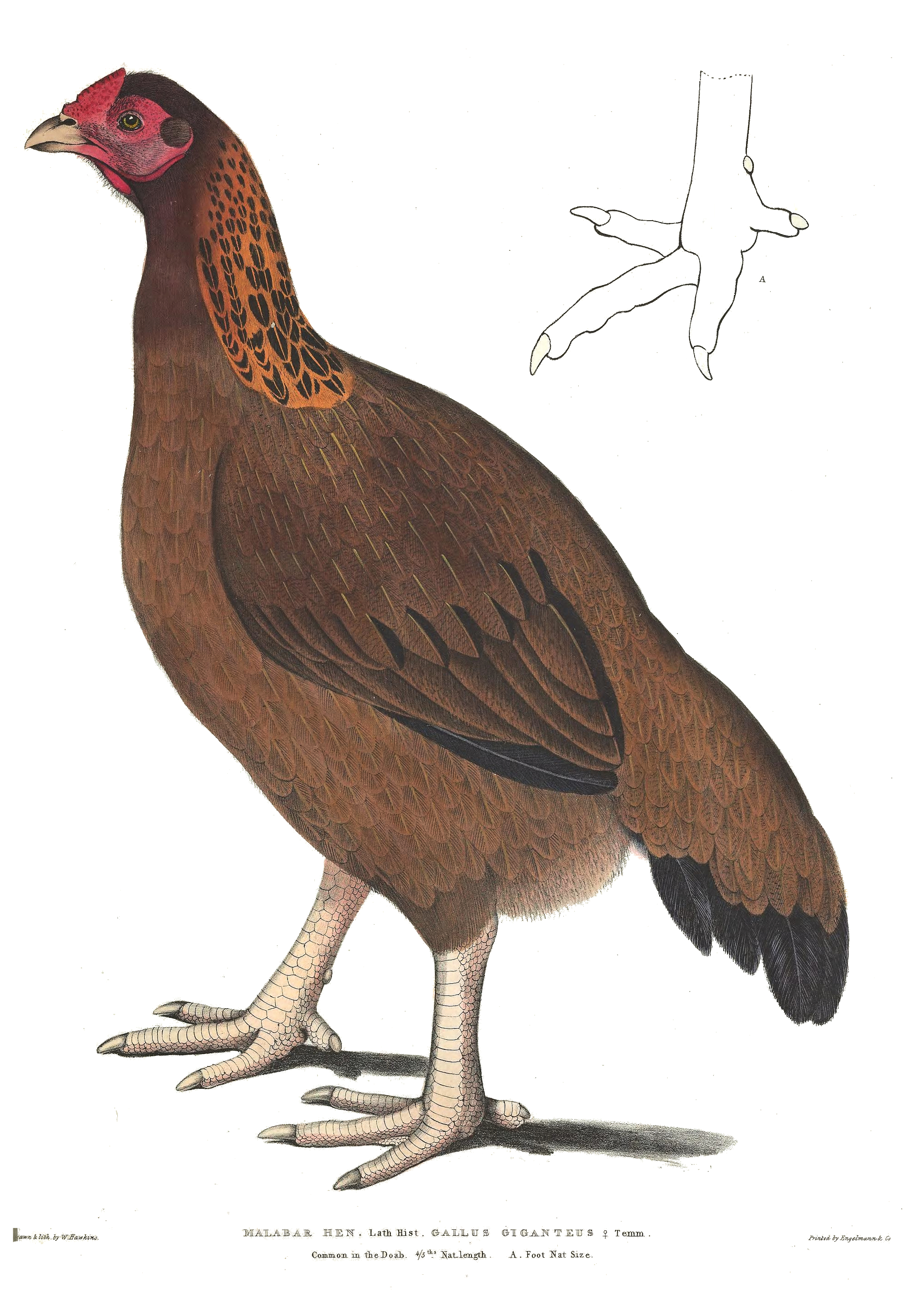
Hen

Gallus giganteus, Jago cock, or Jago Fowl, is a hypothetical species of fowl. It was first described in 1813 by Coenraad Jacob Temminck who named it on the basis of a large foot that he received, having a 5-centimetre (2.0 in) spur. Temminck thought it was a wild bird from southern Sumatra and western Java. Temminck assigned large domesticated species to the binomial Gallus patavinus (from Padua, as there were two breeds from Italy) used by Mathurin Jacques Brisson. It was again described by Leonard Fitzinger in 1878. The birds were described as being large with a comb that extended back in a line along the eye, thick, raised and appearing truncated on the top. The throat was bare and the wattles under the mandibles small. Later authors began to use the name Gallus giganteus for large domesticated species, including from Malabar, which was illustrated in Hardwicke's collection. Temminck believed that Gallus giganteus was one of six wild ancestors of the domestic chicken. Edward Blyth believed that domestic chickens were entirely derived by artificial selection of red junglefowl (Gallus gallus). Charles Darwin also favoured Blyth's hypothesis.
