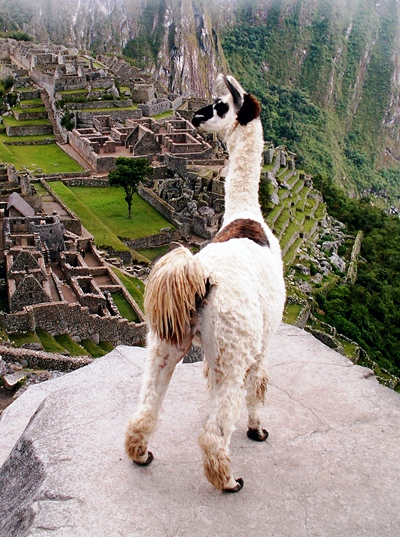
- Llama in Peru

Scientific classification
- Kingdom: Animalia
- Phylum: Chordata
- Class: Mammalia
- Infraclass: Placentalia
- Order: Artiodactyla
- Family: Camelidae
- Tribe: Lamini
- Genus: Lama; Cuvier, 1800

Type species
- Camelus glama Linnaeus, 1758

Species
- †Lama araucana (Molina, 1782); †Lama castelnaudi Gervais, 1855; †Lama provicugna (Boule and Thevenin, 1920); Lama glama (Linnaeus, 1758); Lama guanicoe (Müller, 1776); Lama pacos (Linnaeus, 1758); Lama vicugna (Molina, 1782)

Synonyms
- Vicugna

= Lama (genus) =

Genus of mammals

Lama is a genus containing the South American camelids: the wild guanaco and vicuña and the domesticated llama, alpaca, and extinct chilihueque. Before the Spanish conquest of the Americas, llamas, alpacas, and chilihueques were the only domesticated ungulates of the continent. They were kept not only for their value as beasts of burden, but also for their flesh, hides, and wool.

== Classification ==
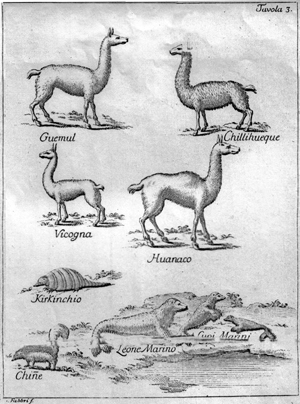
1776 drawing of various lamines, including the mysterious chilihueque

Although they were often compared to sheep by early writers, their affinity to the camel was soon perceived. They were included in the genus Camelus in the Systema Naturae of Linnaeus. In 1800, Cuvier moved the llama, alpaca, and guanaco to the genus Lama, and the vicuña to the genus Vicugna. After genetic testing revealed that the alpaca descends from the vicuña it was also moved to genus Vicugna. The American Society of Mammalogists later moved the species of genus Vicugna back into genus Lama due to low genetic distance between the two. The Royal Society, however, maintains the separation of the two genera.

These New World camelids alongside camels, are the sole extant representatives of a distinct section of Artiodactyla (even-toed ungulates) called Tylopoda, or "hump-footed", from the peculiar bumps on the soles of their feet. This section consists of a single family, the Camelidae, the other sections of the same great division being the Suina or pigs, the Tragulina or chevrotains, and the Pecora or true ruminants, to each of which the Tylopoda have some affinity, standing in some respects in a central position between them, sharing some characters from each, but showing special modifications not found in any of the others.

Discovery of the extinct fauna of the American continent of the Paleogene and Neogene periods, starting with the 19th-century paleontologists Leidy, Cope, and Marsh, has revealed the early history of this family. Llamas were not always confined to South America; their remains are abundant in the Pleistocene deposits of the Rocky Mountains region, and in Central America; some of these extinct forms were much larger than any now living.

None of these transitional forms has been found in Old World strata; North America was the original home of the Camelidae family. The ancestor of modern camels crossed Beringia into Eurasia and Africa about 7 million years ago. The ancestor of the modern llamas entered South America via the Isthmus of Panama about 3 million years ago, as part of the Great American Interchange. The Old World camels were gradually driven southward into regions of Asia and Africa, perhaps by changes of climate, and having become isolated, they have undergone further special modifications. Meanwhile, the New World llamas became restricted to South America following the peopling of the Americas by Paleo-Indians and the accompanying extinction of the megafauna.

A possible variety is the hueque or chilihueque that existed in central and south-central Chile in pre-Hispanic and early colonial times. Two main hypotheses on their status among South American camelids are given: the first one suggests they are locally domesticated guanacos and the second suggests they are a variety of llamas brought from the north into south-central Chile. Chilihueques became extinct in the 16th or 17th century, being replaced by European livestock. The causes of its extinction are unknown. According to Juan Ignacio Molina, the Dutch captain Joris van Spilbergen observed the use of chilihueques by native Mapuches of Mocha Island as plough animals in 1614.

=== Species ===
Genus Lama – Cuvier, 1800 – five species
Common name	Scientific name and subspecies	Range	Size and ecology	IUCN status and estimated population
Chilihueque	†Lama araucana (Molina, 1782)	Domesticated in Chile	Size: Habitat: Diet:	EX
Llama	Lama glama (Linnaeus, 1758)	Domesticated worldwide	Size: Habitat: Diet:	
Guanaco	Lama guanicoe (Müller, 1776)	Peru, Bolivia and Chile, and in Patagonia, with a small population in Paraguay.	Size: Habitat: Diet:	LC
Alpaca	Lama pacos (Linnaeus, 1758)	Domesticated worldwide	Size: Habitat: Diet:	
Vicuña	Lama vicugna (Molina, 1782)	Argentina, Bolivia, Chile, Peru; introduced to Ecuador	Size: Habitat: Diet:	LC

== Characteristics ==
These characters apply especially to llamas. Dentition of adults:-incisors 1/3 canines 1/1, premolars 2/2, molars 3/2; total 32. In the upper jaw is a compressed, sharp, pointed laniariform incisor near the hinder edge of the premaxilla, followed in the male at least by a moderate-sized, pointed, curved true canine tooth canine in the anterior part of the maxilla. The isolated canine-like premolar which follows in the camels is not present. The teeth of the molar series which are in contact with each other consist of two very small premolars (the first almost rudimentary) and three broad molars, constructed generally like those of Camelus. In the lower jaw, the three incisors are long, spatulate, and procumbent; the outer ones are the smallest. Next to these is a curved, suberect canine, followed after an interval by an isolated minute and often deciduous simple conical premolar; then a contiguous series of one premolar and three molars, which differ from those of Camelus in having a small accessory column at the anterior outer edge.

The skull generally resembles that of Camelus, the relatively larger brain cavity and orbits and less developed cranial ridges being due to its smaller size. The nasal bones are shorter and broader, and are joined by the premaxilla.

Ears are rather long and pointed. No dorsal hump is present. Feet are narrow, the toes being more separated than in the camels, each having a distinct plantar pad. The tail is short, and the fur is long and ruffled looking like that of a sheep.

The llama and alpaca are only known in the domestic state, and are variable in size and color, being often white, black, or piebald. The wild guanaco and vicuña are of a nearly uniform light-brown color, passing into white below. The vicuña and guanaco share an obvious family resemblance and may be difficult to tell apart at a distance. The vicuña is smaller and slenderer in its proportions, and has a shorter head than the guanaco.

The guanaco has an extensive geographical range, from the high lands of the Andean region of Ecuador and Peru to the open plains of Patagonia, and even the wooded islands of Tierra del Fuego. It constituted the principal food of the Patagonian Indians, and they use its skin for the material from which their long robes are made. It is about the size of a European red deer, and is an elegant animal with a long, slender, gracefully curved neck and slim legs. The vicuña ranges throughout the Western Andes.
