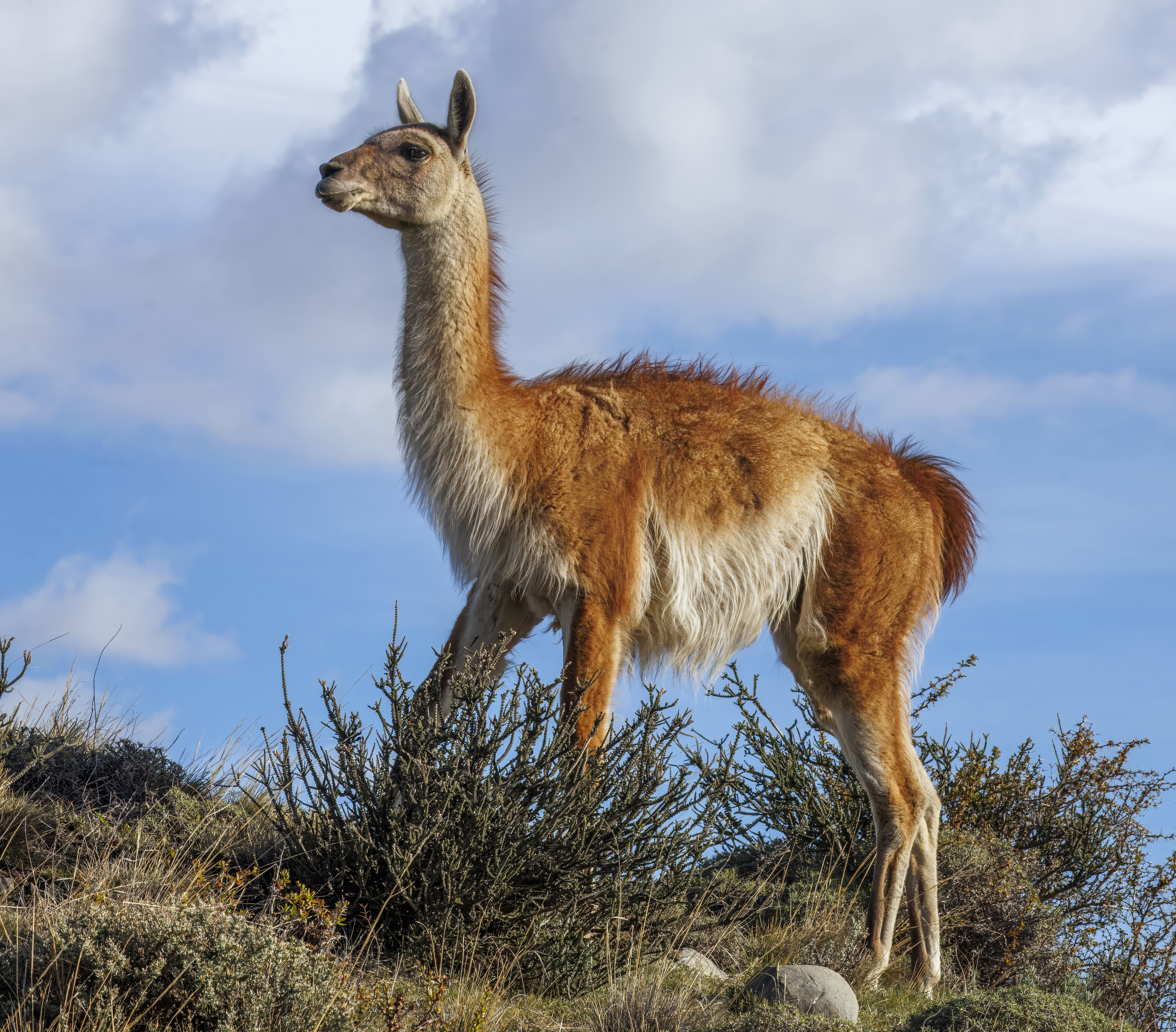
- Torres del Paine, Chile

Conservation status
- Least Concern (IUCN 3.1)
- CITES Appendix II

Scientific classification
- Kingdom: Animalia
- Phylum: Chordata
- Class: Mammalia
- Infraclass: Placentalia
- Order: Artiodactyla
- Family: Camelidae
- Genus: Lama
- Species: L. guanicoe

Binomial name
- Lama guanicoe (Müller, 1776)
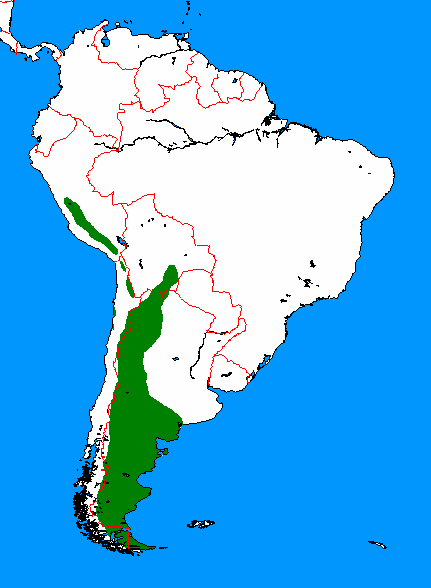
- Guanaco range

= Guanaco =

Species of mammal (camelid)

The guanaco (/ɡwɑːˈnɑːkoʊ/ gwah-NAH-koh; Lama guanicoe) is a camelid native to South America, closely related to the domesticated llama. Guanacos are one of two wild South American camelids; the other species is the vicuña, which lives at higher elevations.

== Etymology ==
The guanaco gets its name from the Quechua word wanaku. Young guanacos are called chulengos or "guanaquitos".

== Characteristics ==
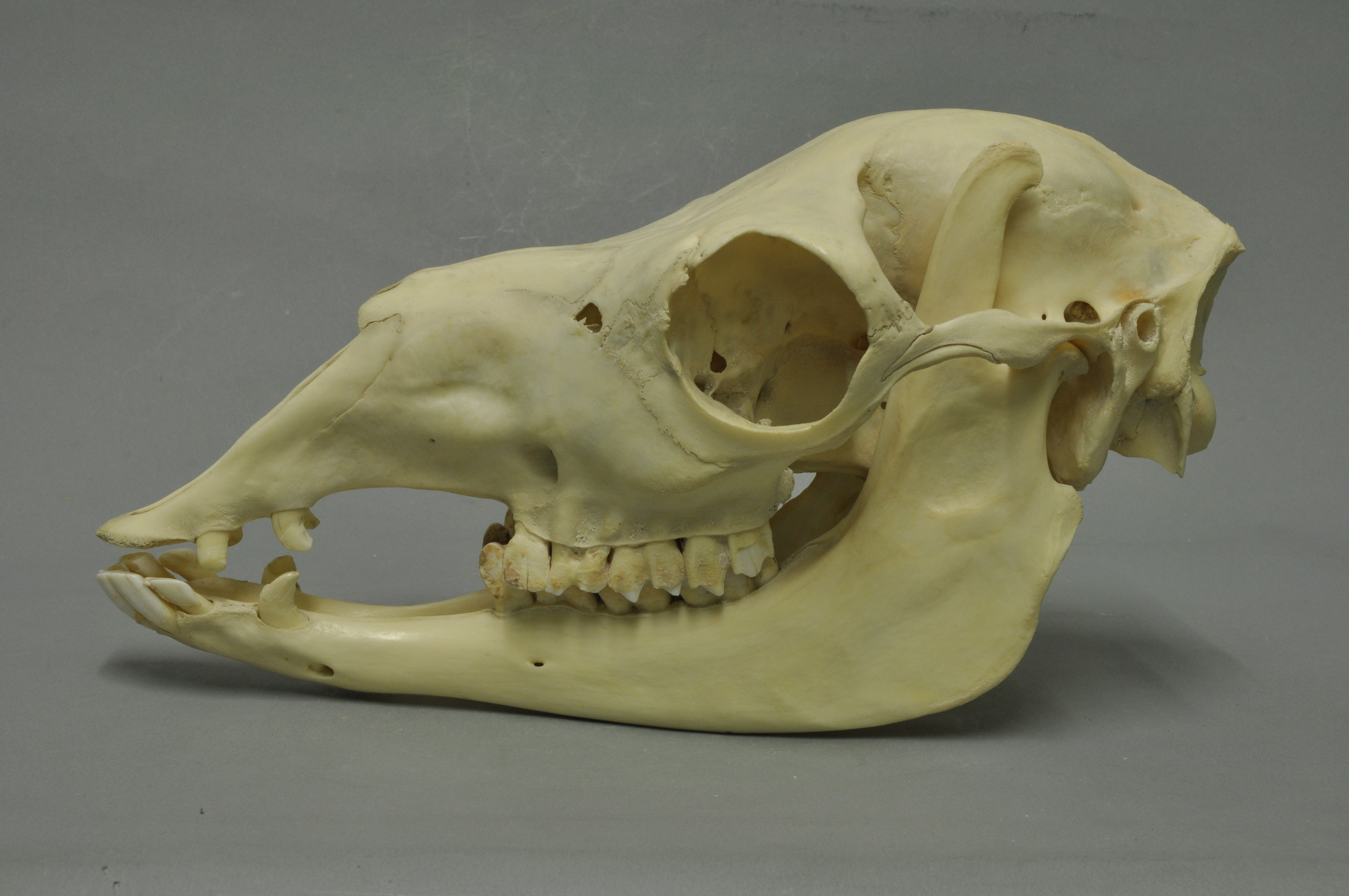
Skull of a guanaco

Guanacos stand between 1.0 and 1.3 m (3 ft 3 in and 4 ft 3 in) at the shoulder, body length of 2.1 to 2.2 m (6 ft 11 in to 7 ft 3 in), and weigh 90 to 140 kg (200 to 310 lb). Their color varies very little (unlike the domestic llama), ranging from a light brown to dark cinnamon and shading to white underneath. Guanacos have grey faces and small, straight ears. The lifespan of a guanaco can be as long as 28 years.

Guanacos are one of the largest terrestrial mammals native to South America today. Other terrestrial mammalian megafauna weighing as much or more than the guanaco include the tapirs, the marsh deer, the white-tailed deer, the spectacled bear, and the jaguar.

Guanacos have thick skin on their necks, a trait also found in their domestic counterparts, the llama, and their relatives, the wild vicuña and domesticated alpaca. This protects their necks from predator attacks. Bolivians use the neck skin of these animals to make shoes, flattening and pounding the skin to be used for the soles. In Chile, hunting is allowed only in Tierra del Fuego, where the only population not classified as endangered in the country resides. Between 2007 and 2012, 13,200 guanacos were legally hunted in Tierra del Fuego.

=== Diet ===
Like camels, guanacos are herbivores, grazing on grasses, shrubs, herbs, lichens, fungi, cacti, and flowers. The food is swallowed with little chewing and first enters the forestomach to be digested finally after rumination. This process is similar to that of ruminants, whereas the camel digestive system is likely to have developed independently of ruminants, rather having forestomachs with glands.

=== Blood ===
Guanacos are often found at altitudes up to 4,000 m (13,000 ft) above sea level, except in Patagonia, where the southerly latitude means ice covers the vegetation at these altitudes. Their blood is rich in red blood cells, enabling them to survive in the low oxygen levels found at these high altitudes. A teaspoon of guanaco blood contains about 68 million red blood cells, four times that of a human.

=== Guanaco fiber ===
Guanaco fiber is particularly prized for its soft, warm feel and is found in luxury fabric. In South America, the guanaco's soft wool is valued second only to that of vicuña wool. The pelts, particularly from the calves, are sometimes used as a substitute for red fox pelts, because the texture is difficult to differentiate. Like their domestic descendant, the llama, the guanaco is double-coated with coarse guard hairs and a soft undercoat, the hairs of which are about 16–18 μm in diameter and comparable to cashmere.

== Subspecies ==
- Lama guanicoe guanicoe from the north
- Lama guanicoe cacsilensis from the south

== Population and distribution ==
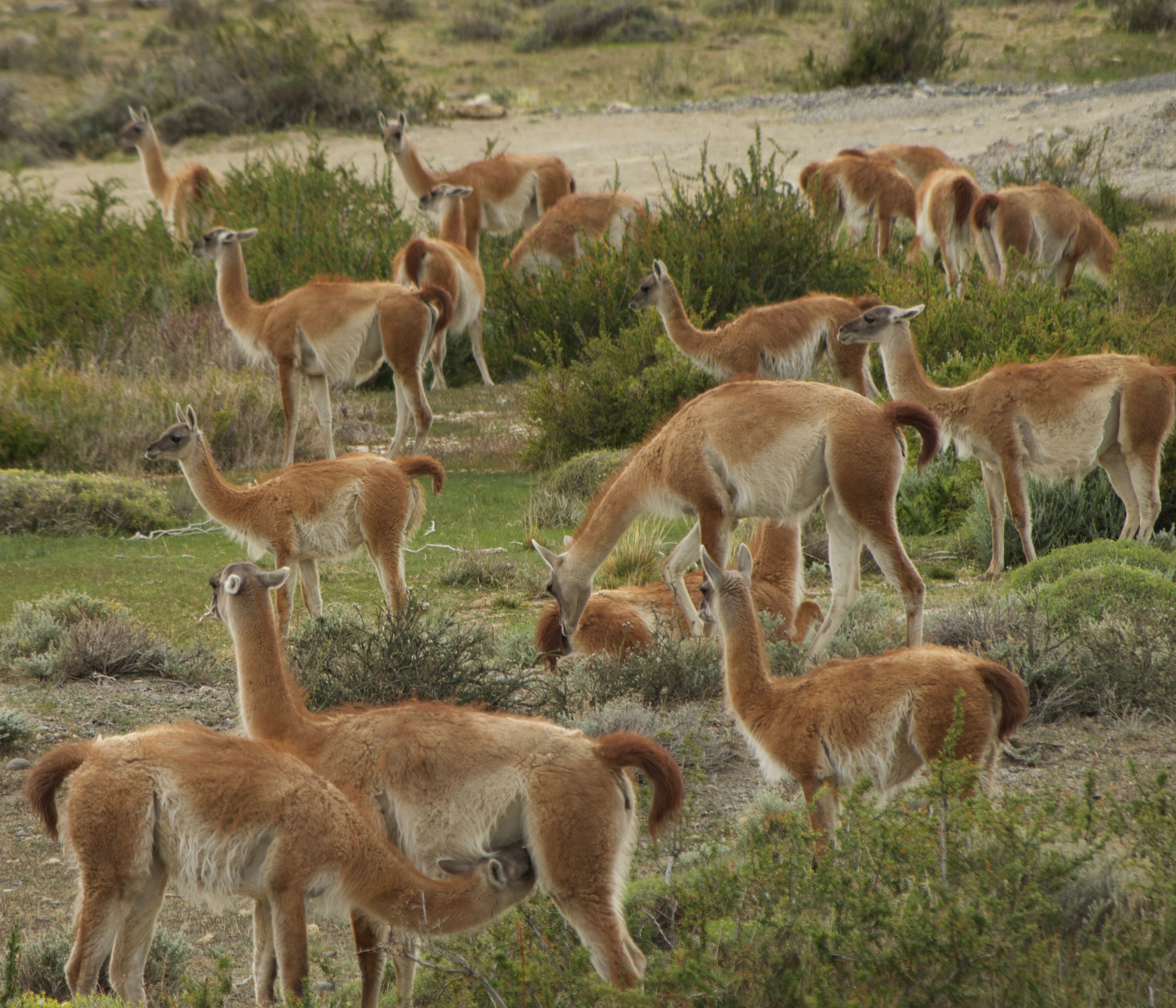
Herd of guanacos

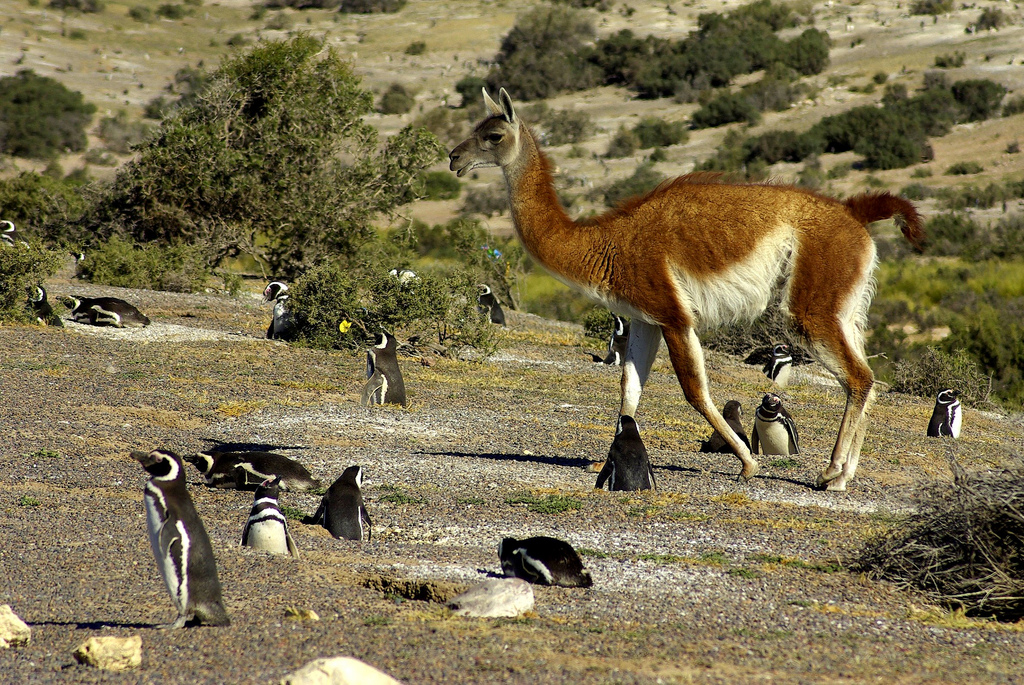
Guanaco sharing a habitat with Magellanic penguins, Punta Tombo

Guanacos inhabit the steppes, scrublands and mountainous regions of South America. They are found in the altiplano of Peru, Bolivia and Chile, and in Patagonia, with a small population in Paraguay. In Argentina they are more numerous in Patagonian regions, as well as in places such as Isla Grande de Tierra del Fuego. In these areas, they have more robust populations, since grazing competition from livestock is limited. Guanaco respond to forage availability, occupying zones with low to intermediate food availability in the breeding season and those with the highest availability in the non-breeding season.

Estimates, as of 2016, place their numbers around 1.5 to 2 million animals: 1,225,000–1,890,000 in Argentina, 270,000–299,000 in Chile, 3,000 in Peru, 150–200 in Bolivia and 20–100 in Paraguay. This is only 3–7% of the guanaco population before the arrival of the Spanish conquistadors in South America. A small population introduced by John Hamilton exists on Staats Island in the Falkland Islands (Malvinas), with a population of around 400 as of 2003. In Torres del Paine National Park, the numbers of guanacos increased from 175 in 1975 to 3,000 in 1993.

Guanacos live in herds composed of females, their young, and a dominant male. Bachelor males form separate herds. While reproductive groups tend to remain small, often containing no more than 10 adults, bachelor herds may contain as many as 50 males. They can run at 56 km/h (35 mph), often over steep and rocky terrain. They are also excellent swimmers. A guanaco's typical lifespan is 20 to 25 years.

In Bolivia, the habitat of Guanacos is found to be threatened by woody plant encroachment.

=== Atacama Desert ===
Some guanacos live in the Atacama Desert, where in some areas it has not rained for over 50 years. A mountainous coastline running parallel to the desert enables them to survive in what are called "fog oases" or lomas. Where the cool water touches the hotter land, the air above the desert is cooled, creating a fog and thus water vapor. Winds carry the fog across the desert, where cacti catch the water droplets and lichens that cling to the cacti soak it in like a sponge. Guanacos then eat the cactus flowers and the lichens.

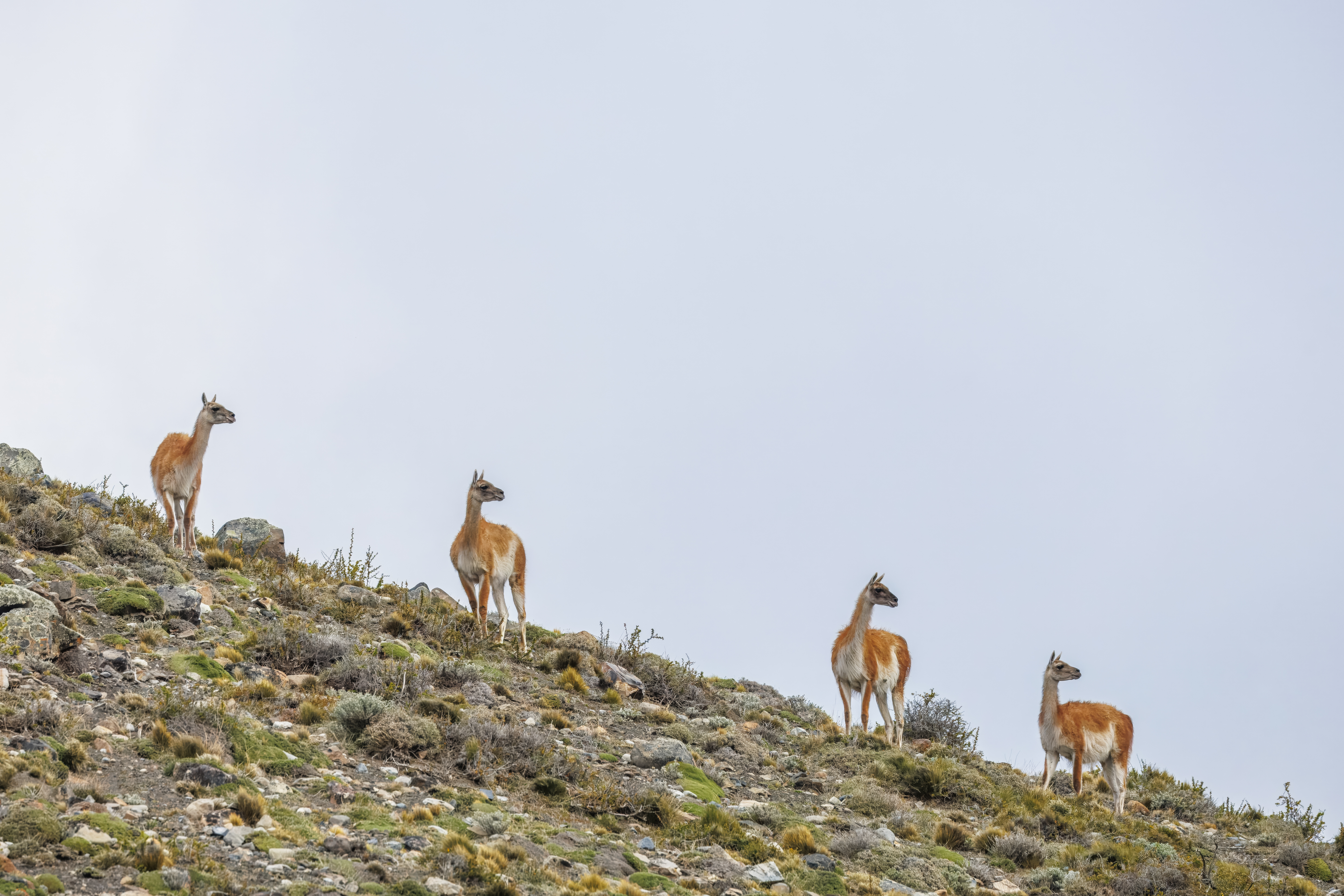
Watching for danger in Torres del Paine in Patagonia

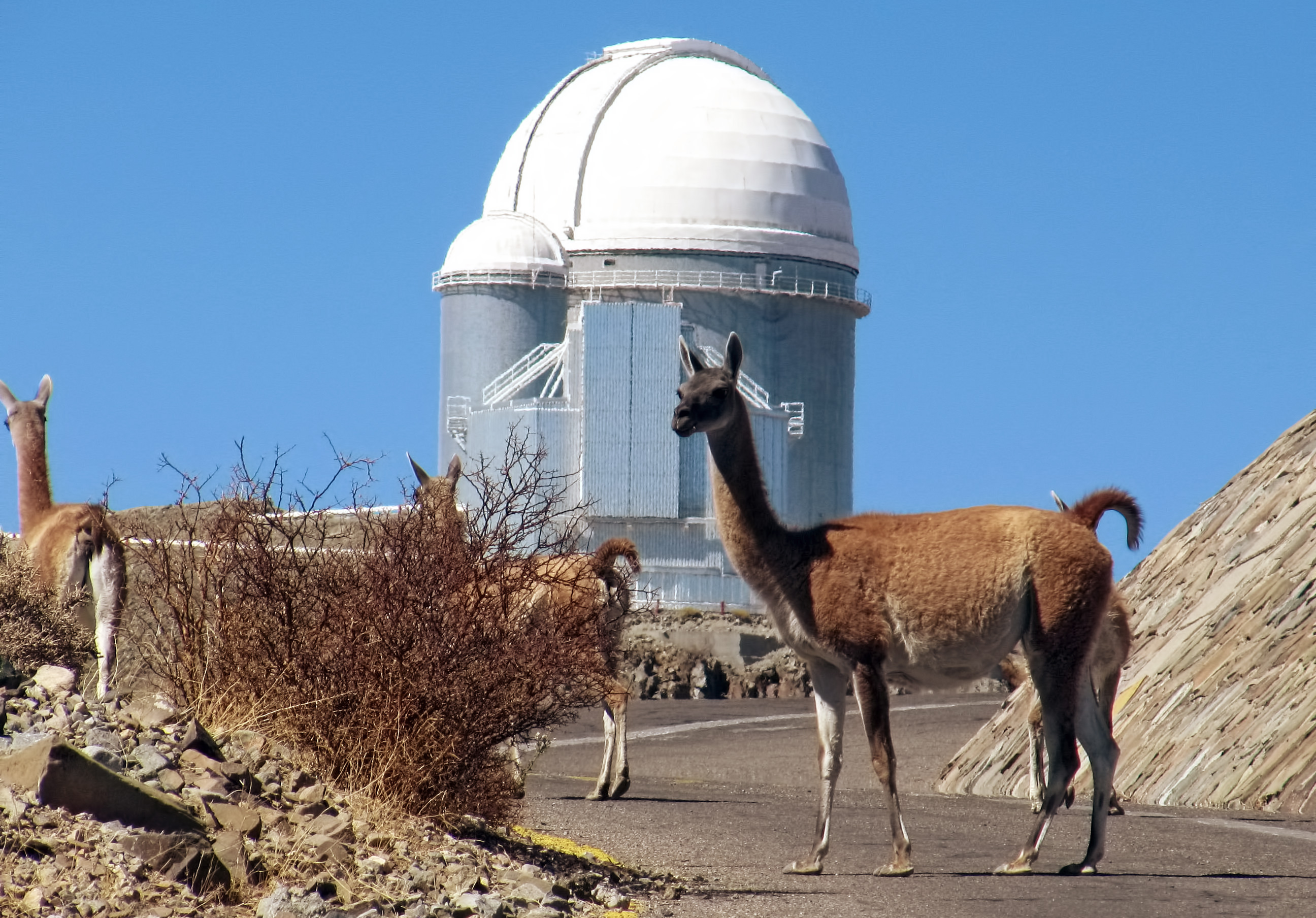
Guanacos near the La Silla Observatory, 2400 meters above sea level

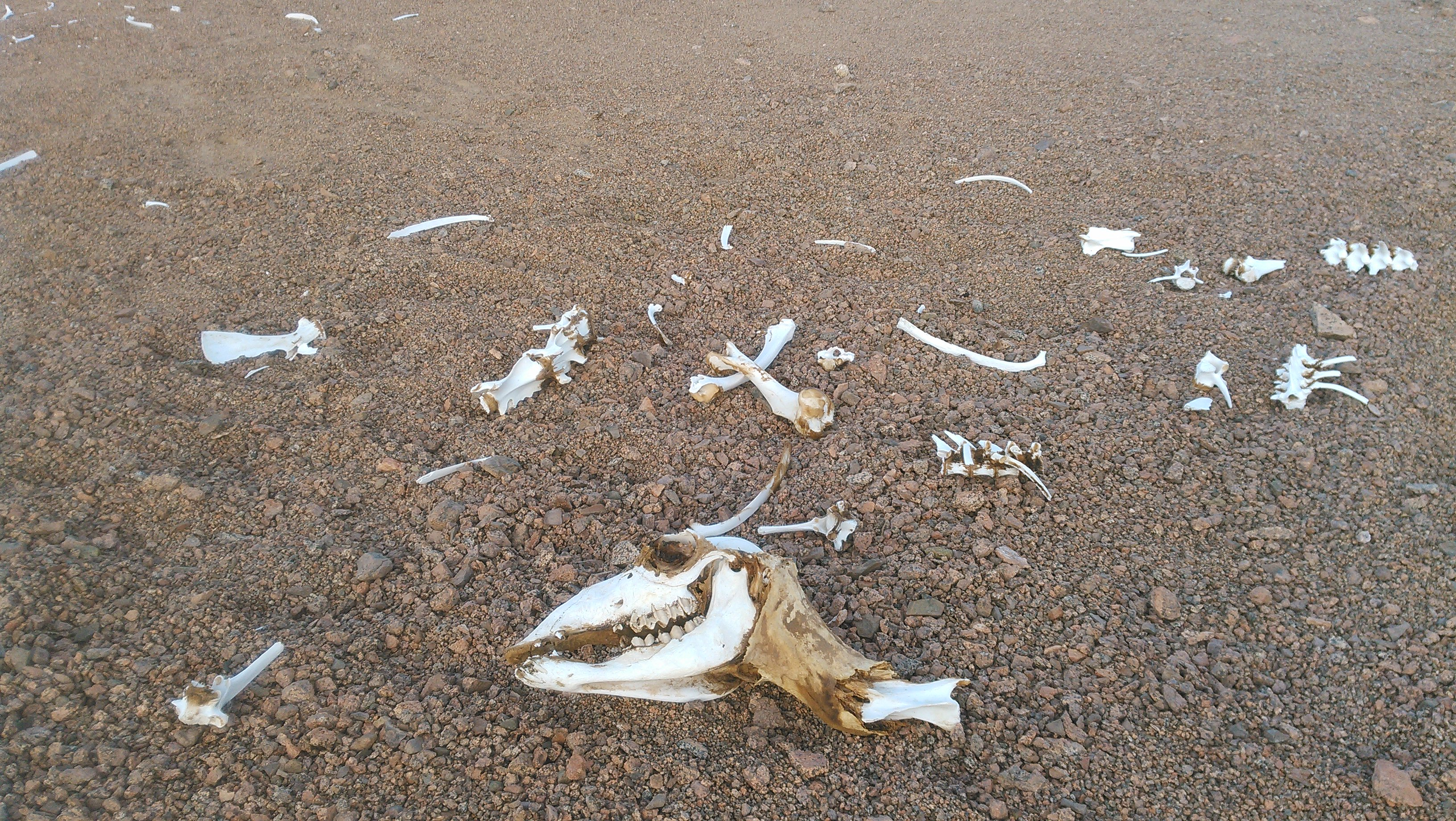
The remains of a guanaco scattered in the Atacama Desert, southwest of Cerro Paranal: The only intact section of skin is the thicker skin around the neck

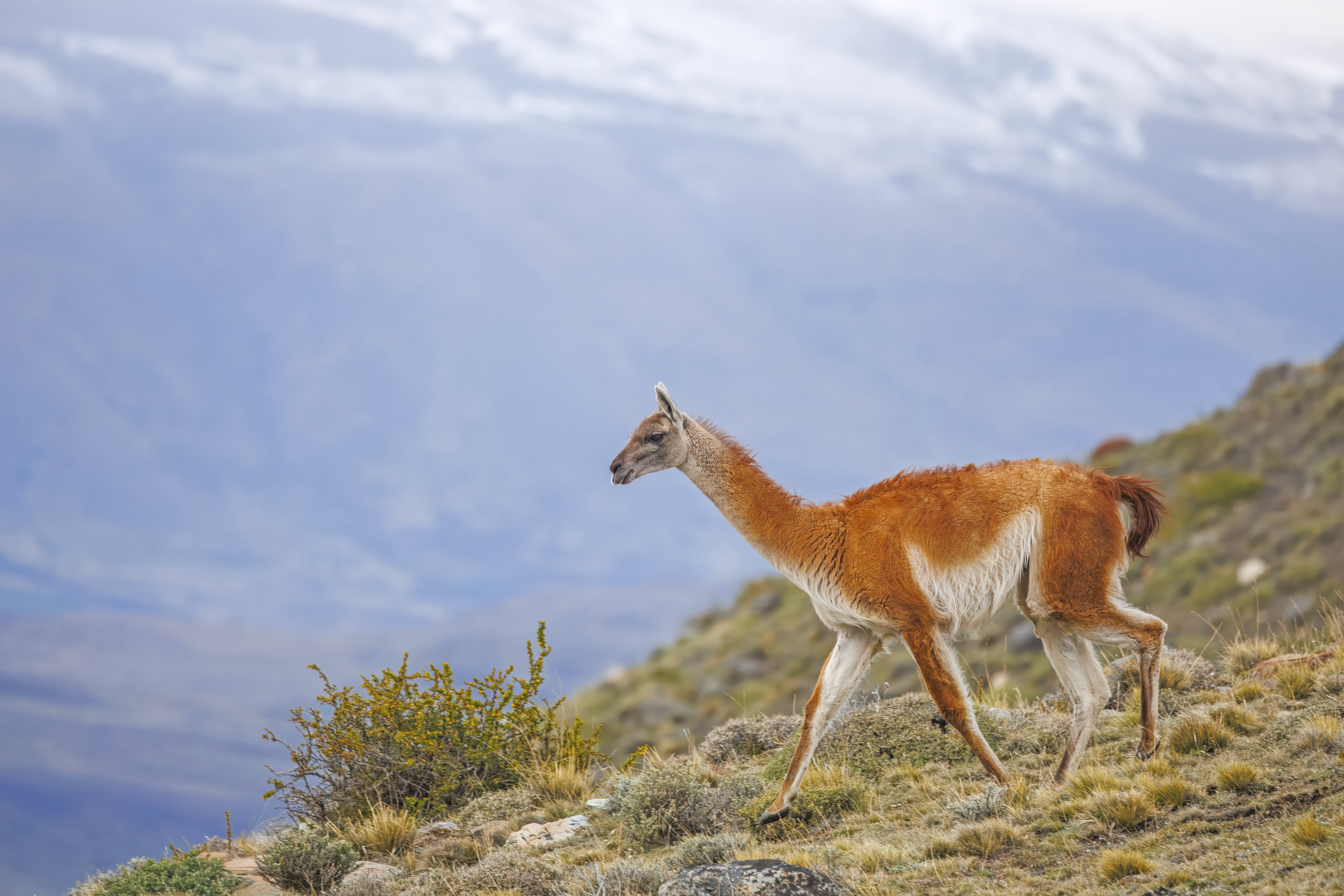
Torres del Paine, Chile

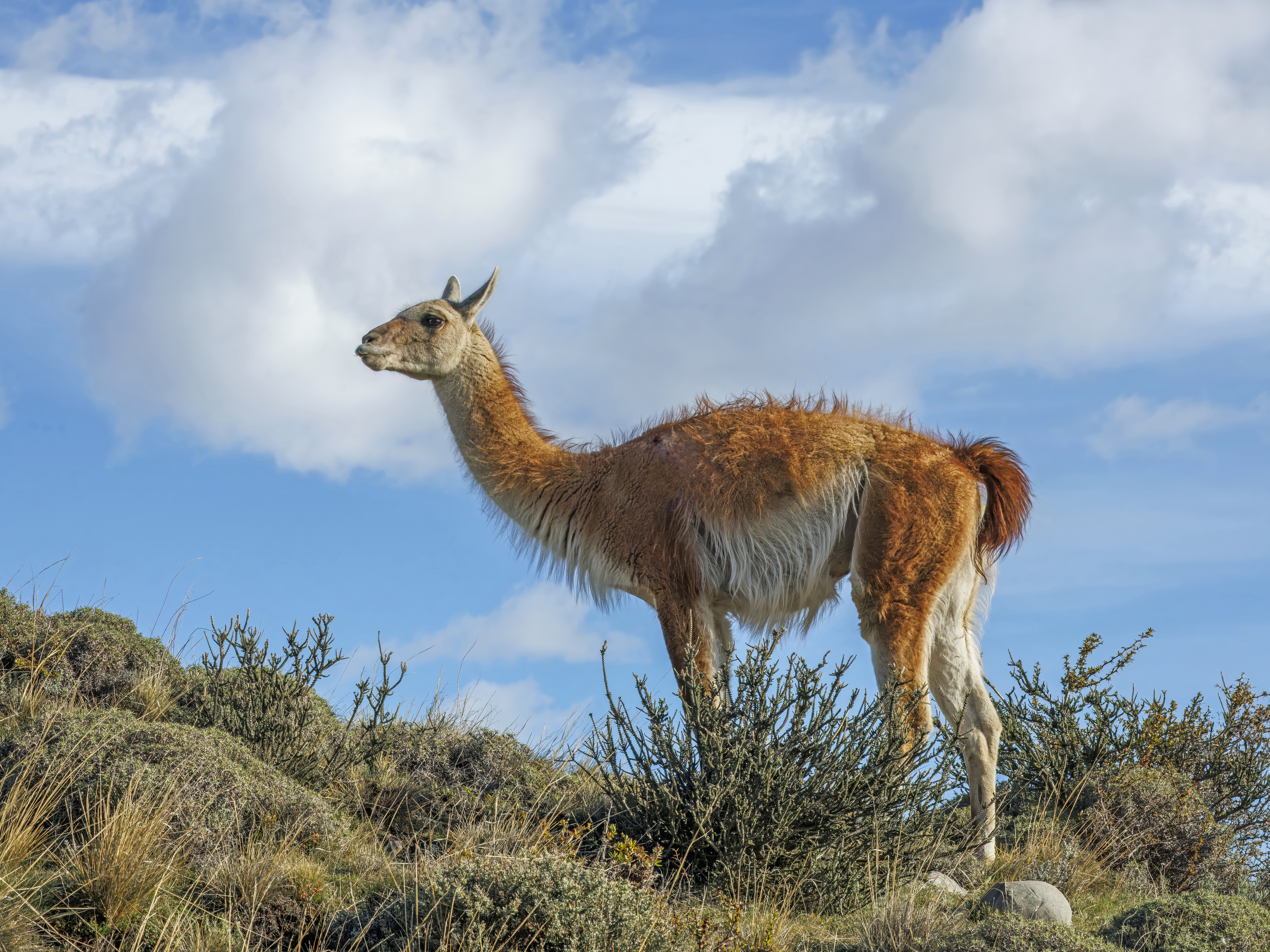
Torres del Paine, Chile

== Ecology ==
The guanaco is a diurnal animal. It lives in small herds consisting of one male and several females with their young. When the male detects danger, he warns the group by bleating. The guanaco can run up to 64 km/h (40 mph; 18 m/s). This speed is important for the survival of guanacos because they cannot easily hide in the open grasslands of the Altiplano.

Natural predators of the guanaco include pumas and the culpeo or Andean fox. Fox predation was unknown until 2007 when predators began to be observed in the Karukinka Reserve in Tierra del Fuego. Scientists attribute this to the unfavourable climatic conditions on the island, which are causing food to become scarce, weakening the animals. The absence of pumas on Tierra del Fuego is also believed to be a factor that allows the fox to occupy their ecological niche. Finally, it is believed that this behaviour is not new, as the fox is nocturnal, which makes any predation challenging to observe. Faced with the threat of the fox, guanacos resort to cooperative strategies to protect their young with a shield formation, a circle around the vulnerable. If they are successful, they chase the fox away, which would be impossible with a puma.

When threatened, the guanaco alerts the rest of the herd with a high-pitched bleating sound, which sounds similar to a short, sharp laugh. The male usually runs behind the herd to defend them. Though typically mild-mannered, guanacos often spit when threatened, and can do so up to a distance of six feet (1.8 m).

=== Mating season ===
Mating season occurs between December and February, during which males often fight violently to establish dominance and breeding rights. Eleven-and-a-half months later, a single chulengo is born. Chulengos are able to walk immediately after birth. Male chulengos are chased off from the herd by the dominant male at around one year old and join a bachelor herd.

== Conservation ==
While not considered an endangered species in southern Argentina and Chile, dead guanacos are a common sight throughout this region where they are entangled on fences. Studies have found that annual yearling mortality on fences (5.53%) was higher than adult mortality (0.84%) and was more frequent in ovine (93 cm high) than bovine (113 cm) fences. Most guanacos died entangled by their legs in the highest wire when trying to jump over the fence.

== Captivity and domestication ==
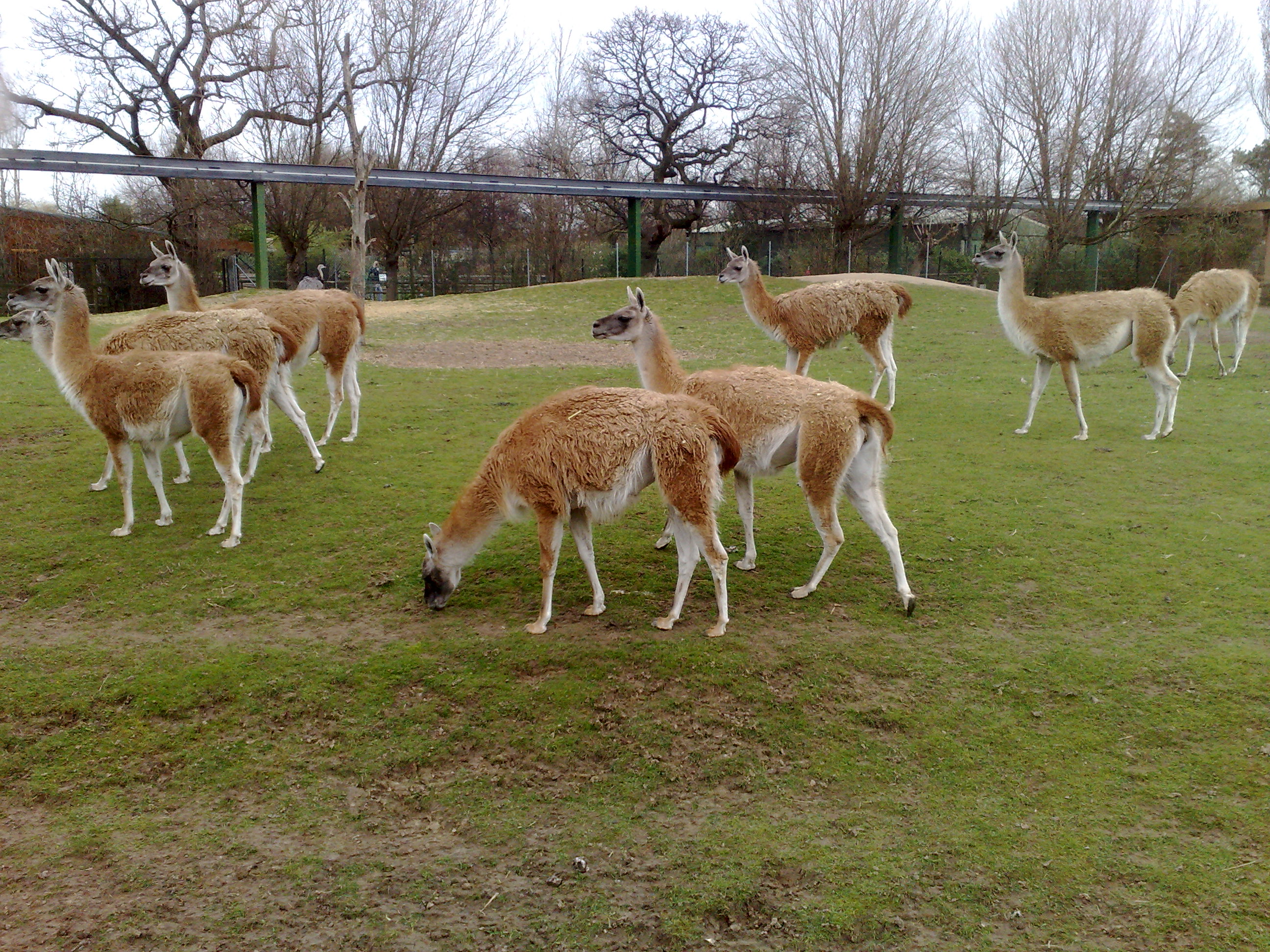
A herd of guanacos at the Chester Zoo

Around 300 guanacos are in U.S. zoos, and around 200 are registered in private herds. Guanacos have long been thought to be the parent species of the domesticated llama. This was confirmed via molecular phylogenetic analysis in 2001, although the analysis also found that domestic llamas had experienced considerable cross-hybridization with alpacas, which are descended from the wild vicuña.

The guanaco was independently domesticated by the Mapuche of Mocha Island in southern Chile, producing the chilihueque, which was bred for its wool and to pull the plough. This animal disappeared in the 17th century when it was replaced by Old World sheep and draft animals.

== See also ==
- Llamanaco
