= Long-necked seal =

- Parsons' illustration of the long-necked seal

Scientific classification
- Kingdom: Animalia
- Phylum: Chordata
- Class: Mammalia
- Order: Carnivora
- Parvorder: Pinnipedia
- Family: Phocidae
- Genus: Phoca
- Species: P. mutica

Binomial name
- Phoca mutica Kerr, 1792

Synonyms
- Phoca longicollis Shaw, 1800

Hypothetical species of seals

The long-necked seal (Phoca mutica) is a hypothetical species of earless seals. It was first described in 1681 by Nehemiah Grew, based on a skin of unknown provenance in the museum of the Royal Society. An illustration of this specimen was published by James Parsons in 1751. In 1792, Robert Kerr gave it the scientific name Phoca mutica. In 1800, George Shaw proposed the alternate scientific name Phoca longicollis. The skin has not been relocated since then, so the existence of the species remains unconfirmed.
