= Waitoreke =

Fictional New Zealand mammal

Creature information
- Other name(s): Kaurehe, Māori otter, New Zealand otter, South Island otter, waitoreki, waitorete
- Grouping: Aquatic mammal
- Folklore: Cryptid

Origin
- Country: New Zealand
- Region: South Island

Waitoreke, also commonly referred to as the South Island otter, is an otter/beaver-like creature in New Zealand folklore. In its rare inferred sightings it is usually described as a small otter-like animal that lives in the South Island of New Zealand. There are many theories on the waitoreke's true identity, such as it being an otter, beaver or pinniped. New Zealand's only recognised endemic land mammals are bats—New Zealand lesser short-tailed bat and New Zealand long-tailed bat. Land mammals introduced to New Zealand by the seafaring Polynesian ancestors of Maori, apparent to the early European visitors and settlers, were kurī (dog) and kiore (rat).

== Etymology ==
The origin of the name "waitoreke" is not well documented; the Rev. Richard Taylor noted its use in the 1840s as "Waitoreke, otter. (Uncertain, perhaps the seal)". It does not occur in Tregear's fairly comprehensive Māori dictionary of 1891, and was said to be "ungrammatical" by leading Māori anthropologist Sir Peter Buck.

Since European settlement (late 18th century onwards) the animal has also been referred to as the "New Zealand otter", "Māori otter", "New Zealand beaver", "New Zealand muskrat" and "New Zealand platypus" based on various accounts and theories.

== Description ==
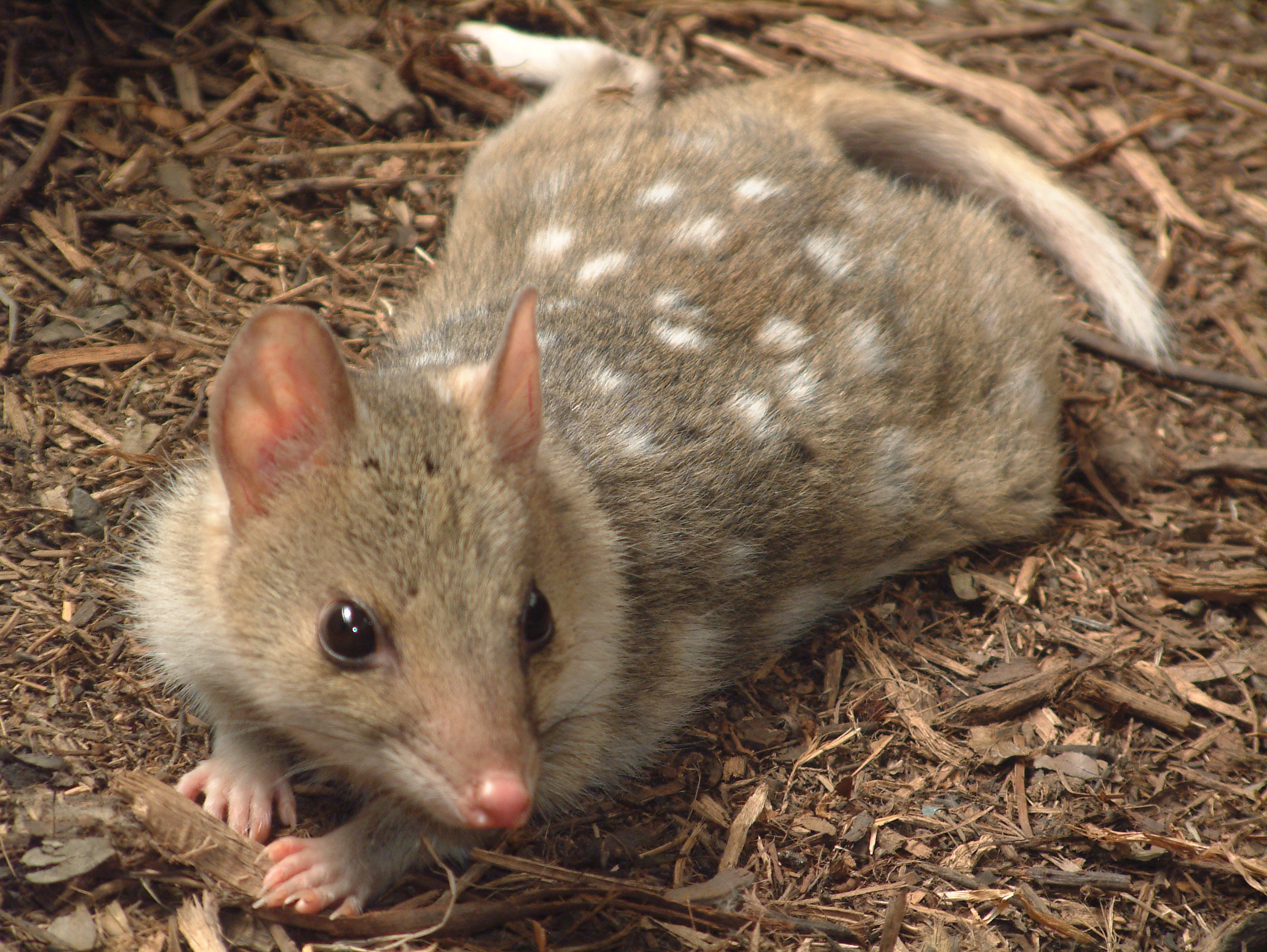
The pelt reputedly obtained by von Haast is described as patterned similar to this eastern quoll's.

The waitoreke is usually described as a small otter-like creature sometimes as big as a cat. It is described as having brownish fur and short legs. The sightings usually place the creature near or in the water on the South Island of New Zealand. Its fur is described as being short like that of an otter.

Very little physical evidence proving the existence of the waitoreke exists. Julius von Haast is reported to have obtained a waitoreke pelt in 1868. The fur was brown, with white spots, and the toes lacked webbing. This is inconclusive evidence; the pelt seems to have resembled a quoll's. The common brushtail possum was successfully introduced in 1858 and is now a widespread pest, whereas the introduction of the common ringtail possum ultimately failed. Both animals are unspotted. It is possible there was an attempt to introduce quolls at the same time as the attempts with possums, as quolls were often considered a type of possum at the time; but these attempted founding populations died off soon after.

== Sightings ==
Evidence for the existence of the waitoreke is mainly based on sporadic accounts of an "unidentified amphibious animal" in the South Island spanning well over 200 years. Areas vicinity to Otautau had more records. Some of the more infamous accounts are dubious and/or incongruous - but a significant number of descriptions (particularly from the late 19th century onwards) share a striking similarity to each other and to species known to exist outside New Zealand. The Māori people said that in old times they used to keep waitoreke as pets.

Some of the most notable early (claimed) accounts come from pre-20th-century explorers and naturalists:

- Captain James Cook—Dusky Sound—1772."For three or four days after we arrived in Pickersgill harbour, and as we were clearing the woods to set up our tents, &c. a four-footed animal was seen by three or four of our people; but as no two gave the same description of it, I cannot say of what kind it is. All, however, agreed, that it was about the size of a cat, with short legs, and of a mouse colour. One of the seamen, and he who had the best view of it, said it had a bushy tail, and was the most like a jackall of any animal he knew. The most probable conjecture is, that it is of a new species. Be this as it may, we are now certain that this country is not so destitute of quadrupeds as was once thought.
  Georg Forster, one of the biologists on board, doubted the observation of a quadruped in his report, A Voyage Round the World: "We were surprised to see the young black dog in the boat with them, which ran away from us [...]. Though this animal had been in the woods during a fortnight, yet it was by no means famished, but on the contrary looked well fed [...] We may from hence conclude, that as there is abundance of food for carnivorous animals in New Zealand, they would probably be very numerous if they existed there at all, especially if they were endowed with any degree of sagacity, like the fox, or cat tribes. In that case they could not have escaped the notice of our numerous parties, nor of the natives, and the latter would certainly have preserved their furs, as a valuable article of dress in their moist and raw climate, for want of which they now wear the skins of dogs and of birds. The question, whether New Zealand contained any wild quadrupeds, had engaged our attention from our first arrival there. One of our people, strongly persuaded that so great a country could not fail of possessing new and unknown animals, had already twice reported that he had seen a brown animal, something less than a jackal or little fox, about the dawn of morning, sitting on a stump of a tree near our tents, and running off at his approach. But as this circumstance has never been confirmed by any subsequent testimony, nothing is more probable than that the want of day-light had deceived him, and that he had either observed one of the numerous wood-hens, which are brown, and creep through the bushes very frequently; or that one of our cats, on the watch for little birds, had been mistaken for a new quadruped.
  In 1864, Captain Frederick Hutton, speculated that the animal seen at Dusky Bay was probably a dog, "as none on board had at that time seen a dog in New Zealand. The evidence of a kind of otter inhabiting the South Island rests upon some foot-prints seen by Dr. Haast."
- Walter Mantell—various—1840s. Recorded in an interview with Tarawhatta, principal chief at Umukaha/Temuka: "He informed me that the length of the animal is about two feet from the point of the nose to the root of the tail; the fur grisly brown—thick short legs—bushy tail—head between that of a dog and a cat—lives in holes—the food of the land kind is lizards, of the amphibious kind, fish—does not lay eggs. Thinking of Marsupials, from our neighbour-land New Holland, I made especial enquiry as to an abdominal pouch. The reply was in the negative; and altogether the account pointed to an animal resembling the Otter or Badger, rather than to the Beaver, which some persons have thought it might prove to be."
- The Rev. Richard Taylor—various—first half of the 19th century and perhaps earlier. Taylor noted in Te Ika a Maui: "A man named Seymour, of Otaki, stated that he had repeatedly seen an animal in the Middle Island, near Dusky Bay, on the south-west coast, which he called a musk-rat, from the strong smell it emitted. He said, its tail was thick, and resembled the ripe pirori, the fruit of the kiekie, which is not unlike in appearance the tail of a beaver. This account was corroborated by Tamihana te Rauparaha, who spoke of it as being more than double the size of the Norway rat, and as having a large flat tail. A man named Tom Crib, who had been engaged in whaling and sealing in the neighbourhood of Dusky Bay for more than twenty-five years, said he had not himself seen the beaver, but had several times met with their habitations, and had been surprised by seeing little streams dammed up, and houses like bee-hives erected on one side, having two entrances, one from above and the other below the dam. One of the Camerons, who lived at Kaiwarawara, when the settlers first came to Wellington, stated that he saw one of these large rats and pursued it, but it took to the water, and dived out of sight." Also, a man named Hawkins, who lived in the green stone lake part of the island for many years, "caught one of the night emus, which is said to have stood near a yard high. He also met with what he called a kind of a fresh-water otter: as he found their skins were not equal to those of the seal, he did not trouble himself any more about them. This appears to have been the beaver already alluded to."
- Julius von Haast—various—19th century. As quoted in Alfred Brehm, Brehms Tierleben, chapter Monotremes: "Another interesting creatures among the most primitive mammals are the only indigenous New Zealand mammal, waitoteke (sic), an otter-like animal which has been seen several times, once from such a short distance that it was hit with a whip, but then it disappeared in the water with a very brittle sound. Jul. v. Haast saw its tracks in the snow. Yet no-one was able to catch the animal so far. It is thought that this mammal is more primitive than Monotremes and will put some new light upon the ascent of the class which ends with the Man." As quoted in Ferdinand von Hochstetter's New Zealand: "My friend Haast wrote me about vaitoteke (sic) on June 6, 1861: '3500 feet above the sea level I found, on the upper part of Ashburton river (South Island, Canterbury province), in a part of the country which no man has ever visited before me, its tracks. These are similar to those of an otter, only a bit smaller. However, the animal itself was observed by two gentlemen who own a sheep farm near Ashburton 2100 feet above sea level. They described the animal as being dark brown, the size of a big rabbit. When hit with a whip, it made a whistle-like sound and disappeared in the water.'"

Later accounts come from a variety of settlers, farmers, trampers, hunters, tourists and scientists throughout the 20th century, for example, Philip Houghton in the vicinity of Martins Bay: "I saw it only for three or four seconds, but this is time enough to get a solid glimpse of something. I saw a furred animal of medium brown colouring – lighter rather than darker – about the size of a hare, but of totally different movement and bodily proportions. The body was solid and the small head seemed to merge into it so that the neck was not clearly defined. The hindpart of the body was larger than its forepart, and the legs were really rather small in proportion to the body. The tail was long, tapering gradually from the body." There they were said to exist in inland lakes and rivers. Many of these sightings were assessed in papers on the subject of the waitoreke by G. A. Pollock in 1970 and 1974, which led to a search of the area around lakes Waihola and Waipori in Otago during the 1980s.
