= Andean wolf =

Purported wild dog

The Andean wolf (previously described as Dasycyon hagenbecki, though this is no longer an accepted taxon) is a purported South American canine that is falsely labelled a wolf. Various tests on the singular pelt have failed to provide a conclusive identity.

== History ==
In 1927, Lorenz Hagenbeck bought one of three pelts from a dealer in Buenos Aires who claimed that they had come from a wild dog of the Andes. The pelt ended up in Munich, where the German mammalogist Ingo Krumbiegel examined it in 1940. Krumbiegel published two papers describing the animal and giving it the scientific name of Dasycyon hagenbecki. The American zoologist Howard J. Stains supported Krumbeigel's new genus Dasycyon. Other mammalogists believed that the skin was that of a domestic dog.

In 1954, Fritz Dieterlen published results comparing samples of hair taken from the Munich pelt with hair from various canids. He found that there were significant similarities between the Munich pelt hair and German Shepherd hair.

=== Skull ===
In 1935, Krumbiegel is said to have studied a skull supposedly similar to that of a maned wolf (Chrysocyon brachyurus) but larger and reportedly obtained from outside of the range of the maned wolf. This gave him confidence in his description of the Munich pelt as a new genus. The whereabouts of the skull are unknown.

== Current status ==
In 2000, DNA analysis of the pelt was attempted but the samples were found to be contaminated with human, dog, wolf and pig DNA.

== See also ==
- Culpeo – Lycalopex culpaeus, a species of canid also known as the Andean wolf
