= China–Poland relations =

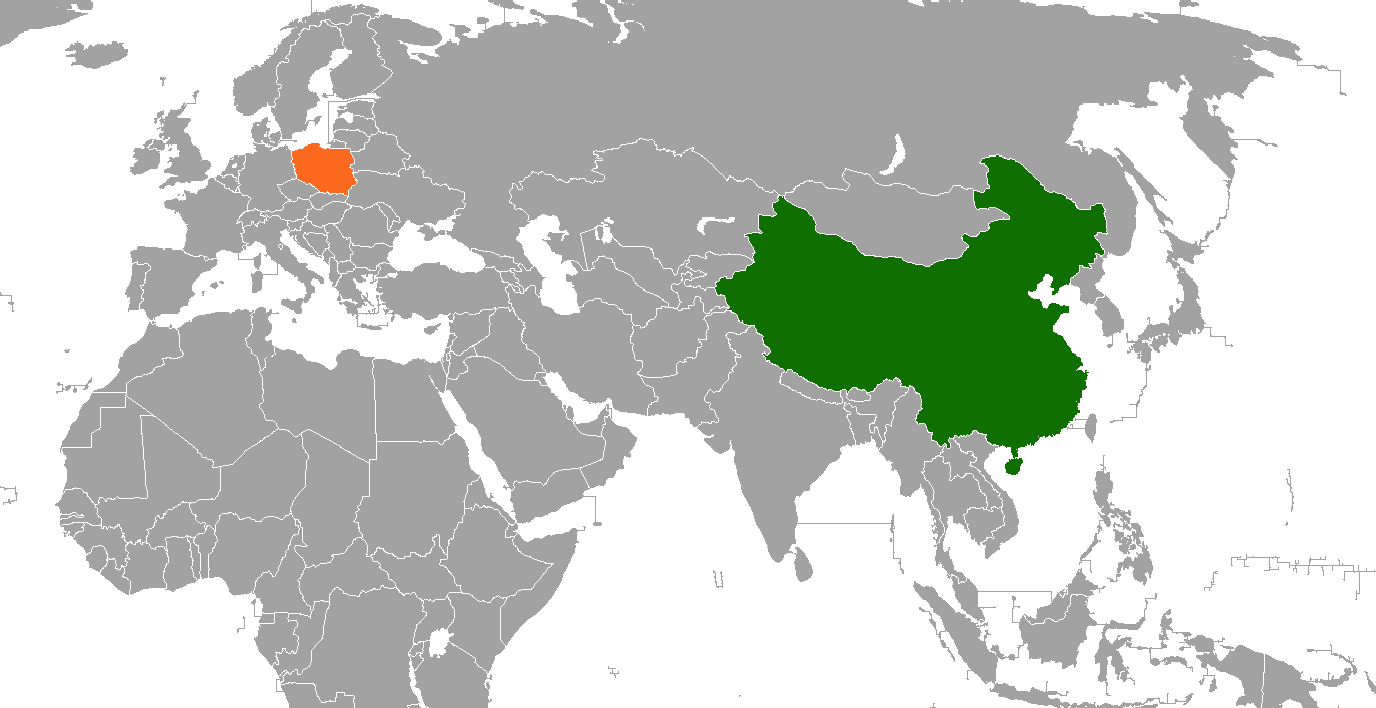
- China: Poland

Diplomatic mission
- Embassy of China, Warsaw: Embassy of Poland, Beijing

The People's Republic of China and the Republic of Poland established diplomatic relations on October 5, 1949.

== History ==
=== Early contact ===
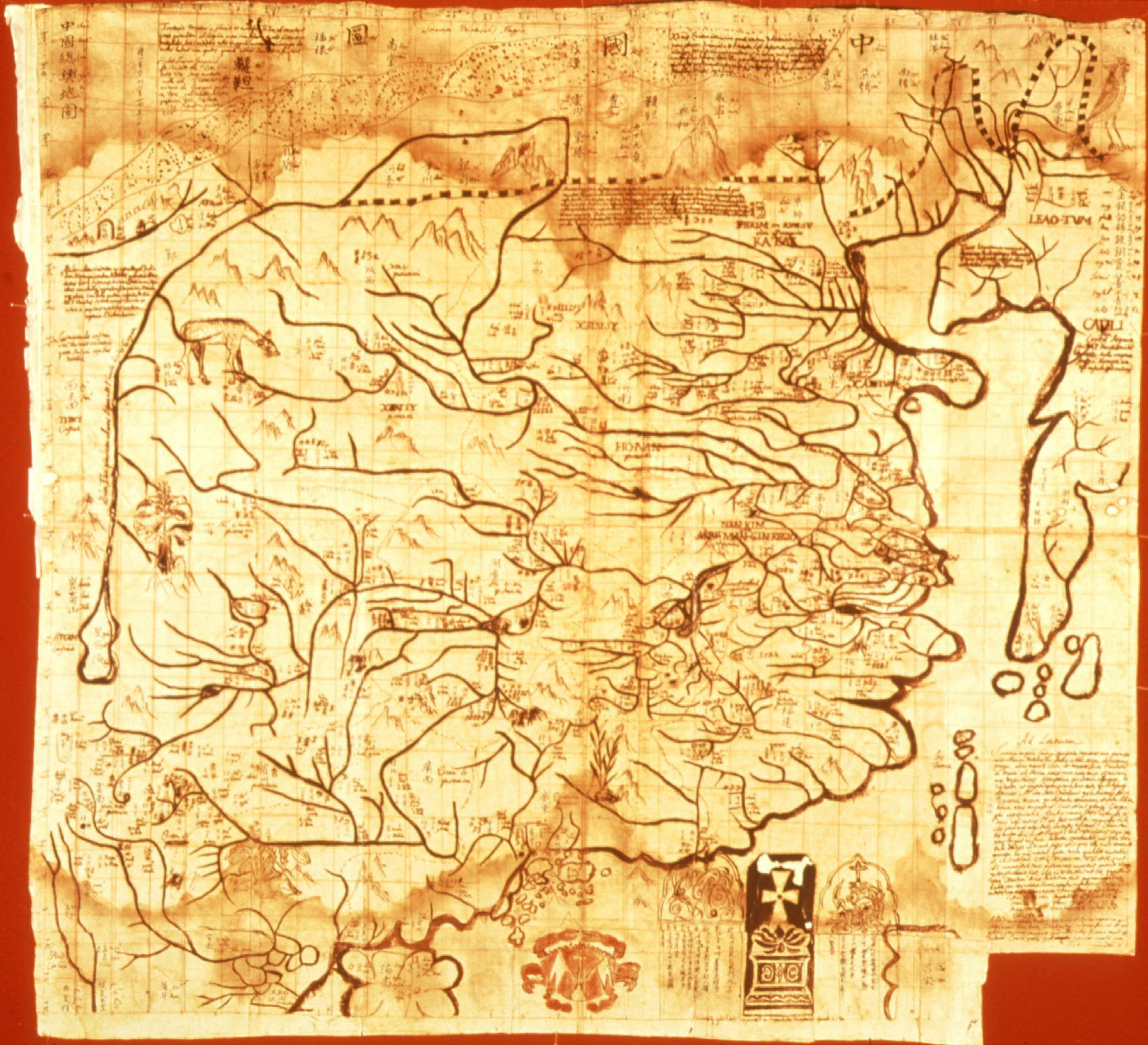
17th-century map of China by Polish Jesuit Michał Boym, the first such accurate map of China in Europe's history

Contact between the Polish and Chinese people date back several centuries. In the mid-17th century, notable Polish Jesuit missionaries Michał Boym and Jan Mikołaj Smogulecki arrived to China. Michał Boym, a prominent Polish Jesuit, traveler, and one of the pioneers of European Sinology, is known as the "last envoy of the Ming dynasty" because he served as the official ambassador of the Chinese imperial court, sent by the Chinese emperor on a diplomatic mission to Europe to seek support for the declining empire and resist the growing expansion of the Qing dynasty. This remarkable Polish ambassador played a pivotal role in history. He gained immense trust in the Chinese court and was sent on a diplomatic mission to Pope Innocent X and King John II Casimir. Boym significantly expanded the knowledge of China in Europe with his works, among which were the pioneering botany book Flora Sinensis and detailed maps of China. He also introduced Chinese medicine in Europe, including the analysis of the pulse. Smogulecki taught European mathematics and astronomy in China, and introduced logarithms to China. Both Boym and Smogulecki had contacts with the Imperial Court of China.

In the 17th century, there were diplomatic approaches between the courts of John III Sobieski and the Kangxi Emperor. Relations between the Polish King John III Sobieski and the Chinese Emperor Kangxi of the Qing Dynasty were the first official diplomatic contacts between Poland and China after the Battle of Vienna (1683). Following the victory over Turkey, John III Sobieski sent his portrait to the Chinese Emperor Kangxi, along with a letter announcing his victory and also commissioned the Polish Jesuits stationed at the Emperor's court to provide the Polish King with all the valuable information about the organization of the Emperor's court and the Chinese Empire. Letters and gifts from the Polish king were sent to the court of the Chinese emperor. This stemmed from the fact that the Polish King was deeply impressed by Chinese power and sought a strong ally. Seeking allies against Turkey, Sobieski sent an embassy to Beijing, to which the Emperor responded by sending gifts, including a valuable porcelain set, elements of which are preserved at the Łańcut Castle Museum. After the victory at Vienna in 1683, John III Sobieski was building an international anti-Turkish coalition. The embassy aimed to establish relations with China, which was engaged in military operations against Russia at the time. The King of Poland was also interested in the prospect of a strategic alliance with the Emperor of China to counteract the Russian expansion. Although the direct correspondence has not survived in its entirety, this gesture is considered the beginning of Polish-Chinese diplomacy. Although the direct correspondence has not survived in its entirety, this gesture is considered the beginning of Polish-Chinese diplomacy. The Chinese Emperor Kangxi honored the Polish king by sending him luxurious, high-quality porcelain. Many of these gifts became part of the collection at Łańcut Castle and constitute unique evidence of John III Sobieski's far-reaching diplomacy. Sobieski ran his own collection of Chinese art in his Wilanów palace.

In the 1820s and 1830s, Polish physician Józef Wojciechowski was active in Beijing, and became renown for successfully curing a prince from the imperial court deemed incurably ill by local doctors, for which he was honoured with a memorial in Beijing in 1829.

In the late 19th century and early 20th century, when Poland remained partitioned and occupied by neighbouring powers, thousands of Polish emigrants, including engineers, architects, doctors, teachers, many of them political refugees, settled in Manchuria and greatly contributed to the foundation and development of the Chinese Eastern Railway and the city of Harbin. The founder and first mayor of Harbin was Polish engineer Adam Szydłowski. The city's layout was planned by Polish engineer Stanisław Jokisz, and other Polish engineers were also responsible for its construction. Poles established a prosperous and influential community in the city, with Polish press, schools, organizations, churches (including the present-day Sacred Heart of Jesus Cathedral) and sports teams, and peacefully co-existed with the city's other ethnicities including the Chinese. Many Poles were employed at the Chinese Eastern Railway, which was managed at the time by Polish railway engineer Stanisław Kierbedź. Tadeusz Nowkuński was the head physician of the central hospital of the Chinese Eastern Railway, active in fighting the plague and cholera epidemics in Manchuria. Poles introduced sugar beet cultivation to China and established the country's first brewery, now known as the Harbin Brewery. Poles also established the first steam mills, metallurgical plants, and furniture and cigarette factories in Manchuria. Several Polish writers, including Teodor Parnicki, Edward Kajdański and Kazimierz Grochowski, were either born or spent part of their childhood or adulthood in Harbin, before eventually moving to Poland, where they popularized knowledge about China and East Asia.

=== Modern relations ===
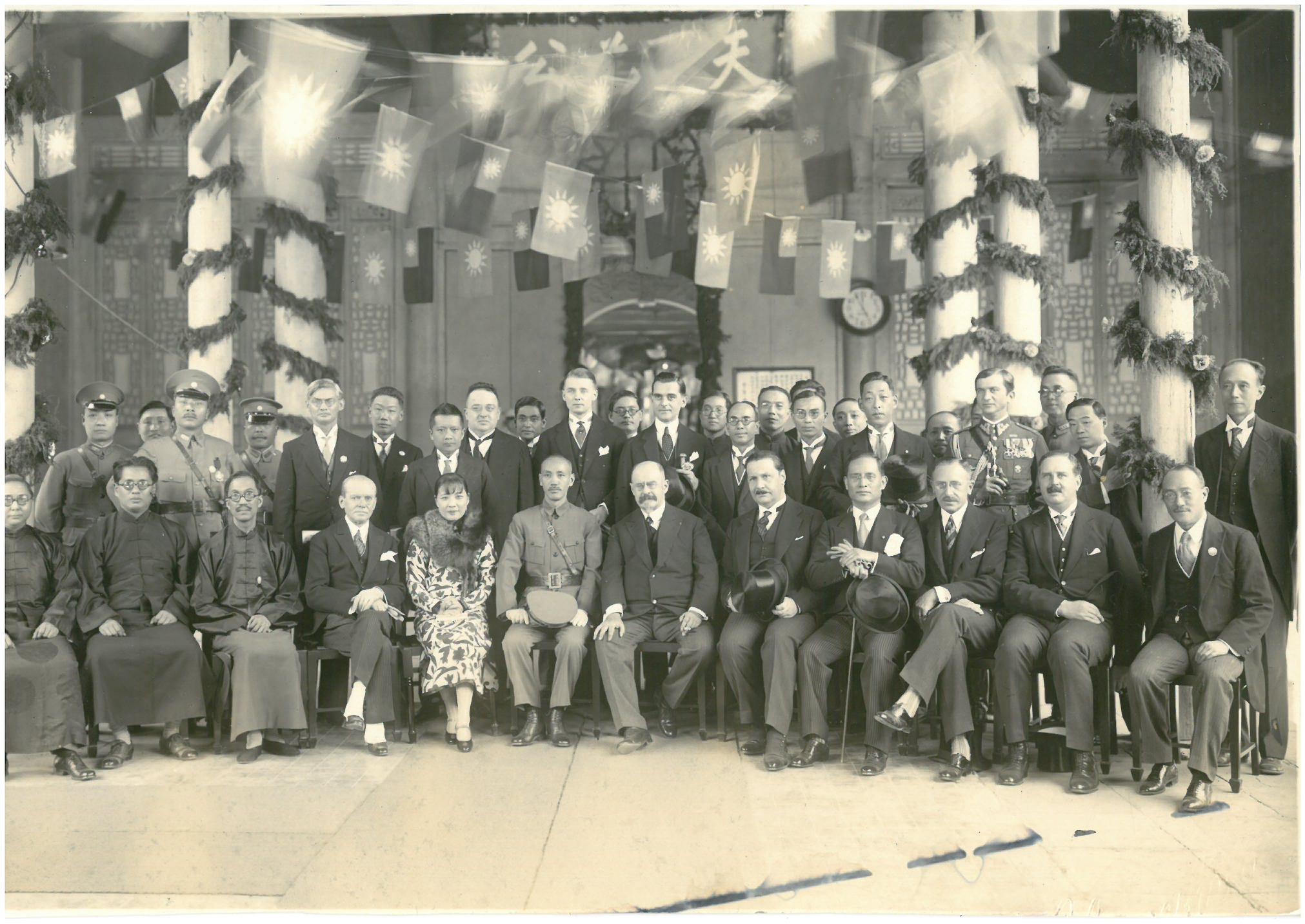
Signing of a friendship, trade and navigation treaty between China and Poland in Nanjing in 1929

China and Poland share similar historical experiences and a long struggle for independence. The powers that supported the partitions of Poland and the suppression of Polish uprisings were the same forces that supported the colonization of China and the suppression of the Boxer Rebellion. Both Józef Piłsudski and Sun Yat-sen held similar roles in the histories of their nations, operating at a similar time (the turn of the 19 and 20th century), though in completely different geographic areas. Both were political leaders who sought independence for their countries using revolutionary methods. In 1913, Józef Piłsudski, the leader of the later reborn Poland, received a response from Shanghai that Sun Yat-sen is readiness for Polish-Chinese cooperation against Tsarist Russia. Józef Piłsudski's brother, Bronisław Piłsudski, wrote in a letter to American journalist George Kenan that he had not only met repeatedly Sun Yat-sen but also maintained friendly relations with him. In 1918 Poland regained independence after the partitions period, and diplomatic relations between China and Poland began in 1919. A friendship, trade and navigation treaty between China and Poland was signed in Nanjing in 1929 to strengthen and evolve the relations. Ludwik Rajchman, a Polish physician and bacteriologist, was an advisor to Chiang Kai-shek and T. V. Soong. Rajchman came from Poland to China to assist the Chinese government in preparing for defense against Japan. Among other things, he assisted in the purchase of aircraft for China from the United States. He also served as a medical advisor. From 1931 to 1939, he served as an expert on the National Economic Council for the Reconstruction of China, and from 1940 to 1943, he served as China's special representative to the United States.

The Polish community in Harbin remained strong, until many Poles gradually left for Poland in the 1930s, and the remaining Poles were mostly repatriated by the Polish government in 1949. However, special bonds connected the city's Polish and Chinese residents. Poles were characterized by an open attitude and a willingness to integrate into Chinese society. They often formed friendships with Chinese citizens from an early age, and even Polish-Chinese marriages occurred. This often gave them the opportunity to become intimately familiar with Chinese culture, including the language and traditions, even as young children. These bonds were also strengthened by shared participation in religious ceremonies. The mutual provision of services and the lively trade between members of the Polish community in Harbin and the Chinese were also significant. After the Japanese invasion, the situation of Poles in Manchuria deteriorated rapidly. The authorities of Manchukuo, controlled by the Japanese, did not respect the extraterritorial rights previously granted by the Chinese to the Poles. The Polish consulate was deprived of the right to intervene to protect the lives and property of Poles who were subject to arbitrary decisions by the Japanese. Japanese-controlled local authorities confiscated property and concessions belonging to Poles. The Polish Ministry of Foreign Affairs was powerless in this matter, and negotiations regarding the return of concessions or compensation were ignored, and Poles' property rights were questioned. Łucja Drabczak, author of the book "My China. Childhood Memories", recalls that Poles living in Harbin maintained from the very beginning that Japan was illegally occupying Chinese territory and forbade their family members from forming close relationships with the Japanese.

The Poles from Harbin also played a significant role in the creation of the Lytton Report, a document that stated that Manchukuo was not a sovereign state, as Japan claimed. On May 9, 1932, at the "Polish Inn," membersspecial commission of the League of Nations met with representatives of the Polish diaspora. The Poles informed the diplomats that the Japanese actions were inconsistent with international law, and their testimony proved to be crucial in the matter and influenced the decision not to recognize Manchukuo and condemnation of Japanese aggression. Meanwhile, three of the four Poles defending Hong Kong were from Harbin. There were never any acts of collaboration by members of the Polish community in Harbin, and the attitude of Poles toward the Japanese occupiers was decidedly unfavorable. Poles living in Harbin openly referred to the situation as an occupation. The activities of the Polish post in Harbin ended tragically, as its members were killed by the Japanese in 1941. Among the Polish diaspora in Harbin there were also Poles who, under the cover of their workshops and ateliers, conducted intelligence activities for the Chinese resistance movement. Journalist Wen Youren and his wife Shan Xi, who have studied this subject, highlight, among others, the heroic conduct of a Pole named Henryk Kaczan and his father. Both men—members of the Polish community in Harbin—organized resistance activities and engaged in intelligence and information-gathering operations. Japanese repression and arrests also affected Poles who aided their Chinese neighbors during these difficult times. In 1945, Poles and Chinese launched a joint local uprising and fighting side by side, drove disorganized Japanese troops out of Harbin, seizing key positions and holding them until the arrival of Allied forces.

The Chinese who fought for Poland was Chen De-fu, born in Dalian, Manchuria. At the age of seven, he lost his parents and was left without care. Polish captain Kazimierz Skorotkiewicz helped the young Chinese by taking him into his care and bringing him to Poland. Chen De-fu fought alongside Kazimierz Skorotkiewicz in the war against Japan. When Skorotkiewicz was captured by the Japanese, he ordered Chen De-fu sent to Warsaw. Chen De-fu participated in the Greater Poland Uprising. After the regular army was organized in Greater Poland, he was incorporated into the 4th Company of the 4th Greater Poland Regiment. He participated, among others, in the liberation of the Jarocin and Pleszew counties, opposing the German occupier. By resolution of the State Council, he was awarded the Greater Poland Uprising Cross. Year later, he volunteered for General Józef Haller's army and fought in the Polish-Soviet War. Chen De-fu, being Chinese and a citizen of the Republic of China, fought for the reborn Poland immediately after it gained independence, and this makes him an exceptional figure in the Chinese-polish relations. In 1933 he obtained Polish citizenship.

Very few Chinese people lived in Poland in the interwar period, including four in Warsaw, and one each in Ciechanów, Brześć and Nieśwież, according to the 1921 Polish census. During World War II, some 13 ethnic Chinese from Warsaw were deported by the German occupiers to the Gross-Rosen concentration camp in 1944.

During World War II, China and Poland were allies, with both the Chinese government and the Polish government-in-exile having signed the United Nations Declaration. On September 12, Chiang Kai-shek sent a telegram to Guo Taiqi, the Chinese ambassador to Great Britain, and Gu Weijun, the ambassador to France, instructing them to convey the message that "from now on, China, together with Poland, Great Britain and France, will fight in Asia and Europe, resisting aggression and showing true friendship and solidarity." Chiang Kai-shek clarified his position on the European war: "In general, our country stands in solidarity with the Poland that has been attacked and supports its stance in the League of Nations". Chiang Kai-shek from the very beginning consistently recognized the Polish government in exile and in the presence of Chinese envoy Zou Shangyou said that "he will always support the just territorial restitution of Poland, standing on the basis of international law blatantly violated in 1939 by Germany and Russia." The fates of China and Poland during the Second World War were similar in many respects, and both countries stood in solidarity on the same side. As a result, Poland declared war on Japan in 1941, while China declared war on Germany, and a year later in 1942 during the stay of Marshal Chiang Kai-shek in Bombay, representatives of the Polish delegation as well as the Polish Relief Committee paid him a visit. The Poles presented Marshal Chiang Kai-shek with a memorandum in which they praised the heroism of the defenders of China and assured the Marshal that the Poles would fight alongside the Chinese until tyranny is crushed and until the nations regain their lost freedom. Chiang Kai-shek was keenly interested in information about the fight of the Poles and expressed gratitude for the solidarity of the Polish nation with the Chinese nation. The strengthening of relations between China and Poland within the framework of the alliance against the Axis powers led to the elevation of the Polish legation in Chongqing to the status of an embassy, and Alfred Poniński became the first ambassador, holding the post until July 1945. General Władysław Sikorski met with the Chinese ambassador and the Chinese foreign minister. During their conversation, the idea of establishing a Polish air force to fight the Japanese in China emerged. Among the Polish volunteers fighting in defense of China was the renowned pilot Witold Urbanowicz, who after fighting the Germans in Europe, decided to go to Asia to fight the Japanese. In his diary, Urbanowicz wrote that the German and Japanese regimes were one and the same evil, so it didn't matter to him where he was in the world; he simply wanted to help those in need. Another example of a Pole who fought to defend China was Lieutenant Colonel Włodzimierz Szymankiewicz, who fought against the Japanese aggressors in northeastern China. Szymankiewicz fought alongside the Chinese army and, together with his Chinese comrades, captured seven Japanese soldiers. In one battle, he was severely wounded and lost consciousness. He later learned that he had been rescued by local Chinese who had taken him from the battlefield and provided him with medical care.

Certain parallels exist between the perception of Germany in Poland and Japan in China. This similarity was observed by Chinese historian Yinan He. Poland and China associate their neighbouring nations with a negative, bellicose stereotype that harks back to the Second World War. However, this war is perceived as merely the latest incident in a long history of transgressions. Post-war, both countries came under communist rule, further demonising the former enemy.

==== Cold War ====
After World War II, China and Poland again found themselves on the same side of the political stage. The Polish People's Republic was one of the first states to recognize the People's Republic of China and the second, after the USSR, to open an embassy there. Relations between the newly founded People's Republic of China and the Polish People's Republic began on October 5, 1949, and diplomatic missions were established shortly after on October 7, 1949. Poland, a part of the Communist Bloc, had friendly relations with China and both countries cooperated in international issues such as the Korean War.

In 1951, China and Poland established Chipolbrok "Chinese-Polish Shipbrokers' Company" based on an agreement between Poland and China to establish a sea connection between Chinese and Polish ports. The governments of Poland and China, represented by the ministers of transport of both countries, hold 50% of the shares each. Chipolbrok is the oldest Chinese deep-sea shipowner and the first enterprise with foreign capital in the People's Republic of China. Its establishment enabled the then-isolated China to develop a transportation network connecting it with the global trade and services market. The naval alliance between the People's Republic of Poland and the People's Republic of China between 1950 and 1957 brought the Middle Kingdom numerous benefits, contributing to the break of the naval blockade and strengthening its position in the Far East. The Poles also made no secret of their satisfaction with the results of their cooperation with the Chinese. It undoubtedly enhanced their prestige among the Eastern Bloc countries and resulted in China's support for Władysław Gomułka's new government. The company is still operating and remains a symbol of Polish-Chinese friendship and cooperation.

In 1956, fears in Poland grew of an armed intervention by the Soviet Union, the leadership of which was alarmed by the events of the Gomułka thaw. When Władysław Gomułka took over leadership in Poland, the USSR was the only source of information on this matter for China. Mao Zedong came to the conclusion that he could not entirely trust the information coming from Moscow, so he asked the Chinese ambassador in Poland for a realistic assessment of the situation. In this way, Mao learned that Khrushchev and his associates were presenting false information about the situation in Poland. On the night of October 21-22, leading representatives of the People's Republic of China met to discuss the situation in Poland. The result of this conversation was a warning sent to Moscow that if Khrushchev decided to intervene in Poland, Beijing would issue an official communiqué condemning the USSR. On October 23, a Chinese delegation met with representatives of the Communist Party of the Soviet Union in the Kremlin. The meeting was attended by delegations from other countries that Khrushchev had convinced to intervene in Poland, creating a false narrative that Gomułka allegedly wanted to bring about the disintegration of the Eastern Bloc. The Chinese delegation, undaunted by Khrushchev's dire announcements, steadfastly maintained its position that China would not consent to intervention in Poland. That same day, Mao invited Polish ambassador Stanisław Kiryluk to the Central Committee of the People's Republic of China. The Chinese leadership informed him of China's full support for the changes taking place within the Central Committee of the Polish United Workers' Party. Mao Zedong wrote to Pavel Yudin, the Soviet ambassador in Beijing, on November 19, 1956:

"We have received a request from the Central Committee of the Communist Party of the Soviet Union to express our opinion on the communiqué stating that you intend to send your troops to intervene in Poland. This afternoon, our Politburo, after discussing this matter, stated that we categorically oppose your conduct. Please tell Khrushchev by telephone that if the Soviet Union uses the army, we will support the Poles against you and publish a message condemning your armed intervention in Poland."

The Chinese leader also criticized Khrushchev, claiming he represented "great-power chauvinism". The support from China strengthened Gomułka's position in the Communist Bloc and reinforced his efforts to pursue more autonomy from the Soviet Union. China promoted the idea of a “national path to socialism,” which aligned with Gomułka's reformist course and made it possible to move away from Stalinism without breaking away from the Communist Bloc altogether.

During the Sino-Soviet split, Władysław Gomułka didn't engage the Polish United Workers' Party in the Sino-Soviet conflict, which had been escalating since the early 1960s. Gomułka believed that beneath the guise of ideological conflict lay a dispute over leadership within the communist bloc, which weakens its solidarity and only the Western powers would benefit from it. Gomułka argued that the USSR was partly responsible for the crisis because it did not sufficiently respect China's interests and did not treat it as an equal partner. In 1963, Gomułka opposed Khrushchev's plans to include the Mongolian People's Republic in the Warsaw Pact, then dominated by the USSR, because he considered it a hostile move aimed at isolating the People's Republic of China from other members of the communist bloc. A significant factor in limiting bilateral relations was the Cultural Revolution, during which China decided to limit its relations with other countries in order to become independent from their influence. Despite this, Poland continued to maintain an embassy and consulates in China, and Chipolbrok continued its operations, albeit on a limited scale. Moreover, the Polish People's Republic supported the People's Republic of China's application to grant mainland China the permanent seat of the United Nations.

Zhou Enlai, the Premier of China, paid two state visits to Poland. Polish communist leaders, including Bolesław Bierut, Edward Ochab and Józef Cyrankiewicz also made multiple visits to China.

In 1965, at the initiative of Kazimierz Mijal, a Polish Maoist, the illegal Communist Party of Poland was founded. This party proclaimed to be based on the ideas of "Marx, Lenin, Stalin, and Mao". It demanded a "dictatorship of the proletariat," a strictly centralized economy, and the collectivization of agriculture. It believed that Khrushchev had betrayed communism and that the center of the world revolution had shifted to China. Kazimierz Maijl maintained relations with the Chinese leadership and in 1978 wnet to China where, shortly after his arrival, he published the articles "Long Live Mao Thought" and "The Meaning of the Three Worlds Theory". He returned to Poland in 1983 and continued to operate under the Communist Party of Poland's banner, attacking Wojciech Jaruzelski's government.

==== Post-Cold War ====
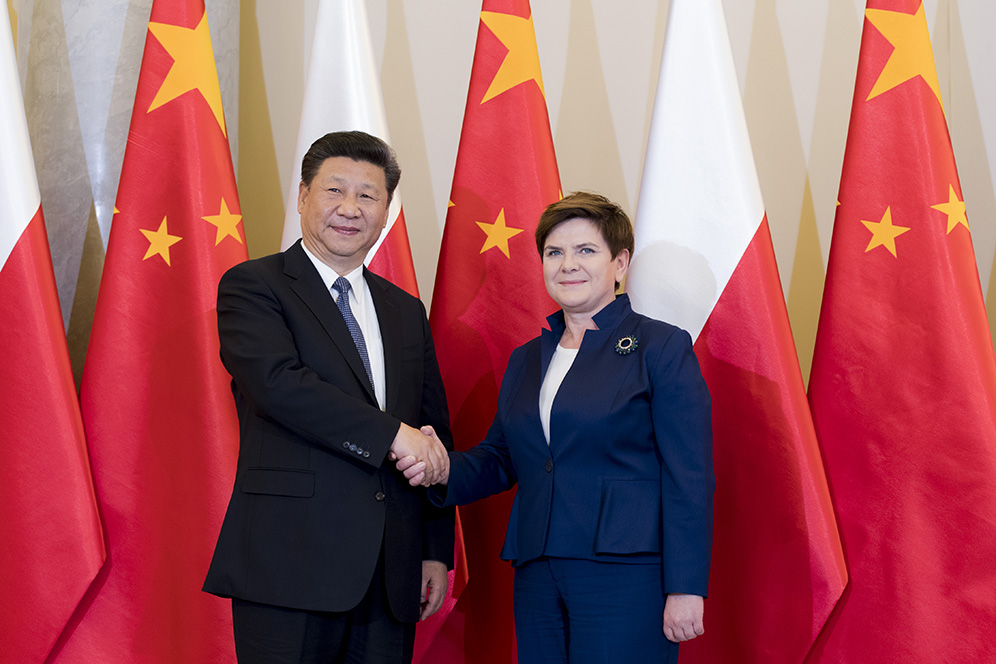
Poland's Prime Minister Beata Szydło and China's General Secretary of the Communist Party Xi Jinping at a meeting, 2016

In 1989 Communism in Europe fell, and Poland underwent widespread democratization and market-oriented economic reform. At this time, China was also becoming more market-driven, largely as a result of the economic reforms of Deng Xiaoping. The newly formed Third Polish Republic chose to align itself with the West, joining NATO in 1999, and the European Union in 2004. Despite this, relations between Poland and China remained steadfast throughout the 2000s.

In 2016, general secretary of the Chinese Communist Party, Xi Jinping visited Poland, where he stated that "Polish companies will benefit hugely" from China's Belt and Road Initiative. Duda and Xi signed a joint declaration on strategic partnership in which they reiterated that Poland and China viewed each other as long-term strategic partners.

On November 6, 2019, an exhibition dedicated to China's resistance to Japanese aggression opened at the Museum of the Second World War in Poland. The exhibition aimed to present World War II from a Chinese perspective, and primarily from the perspective of the Chinese population. A key element of the exhibition were graphics and illustrations by Chinese artists who created during the Japanese occupation of China from 1937 to 1945, depicting its atrocities. The exhibition was organized in cooperation with the Museum of Chinese Resistance to Japanese Aggression in Beijing. The exhibition opening was attended by Consul General Wang Qingshan, Director of the Museum of Chinese Resistance to Japanese Aggression Li Zongyuan, and other representatives of the delegation from Chinese institutions. During the opening, Karol Nawrocki, Director of the Museum of the Second World War and future President of Poland, emphasized the significance of the conflict for both nations and the similar historical experiences that strongly connect Poland and China. Nawrocki expressed respect and said that Poland remembers that China fought against the Empire of Japan, the main ally of Nazi Germany, and therefore an ally of a sate that was a mortal enemy of Poland. Chinese representatives attending the meeting also expressed respect for Poland for fighting against the Axis bloc. During the meeting, Poles and Chinese recognized that their common historical experiences could allow them to learn from each other and avoid such events in the future. Both institutions, the Museum of Chinese Resistance to Japanese Aggression and the Polish Museum of the Second World War, strive to preserve the achievements and legacy of suffering in order to disseminate knowledge among both nations.

In January 2019, The Internal Security Agency (ABW) detained a Polish man and a Chinese man suspected of espionage collaboration. The detained Pole was an employee of Orange Polska and a former officer of the Polish secret services, while the detained Chinese man was a director at Huawei's Polish headquarters. The situation was reported by the Deputy Minister-Coordinator of the Secret Services. The court ordered the suspects to be detained for three months. The Pole and the Chinese were charged with "working for foreign intelligence". The Chinese company issued a statement about the release of the arrested person.

In June 2024, Polish President Andrzej Duda visited Beijing. During the visit, China decided, among other things, to waive short-term visas for Polish citizens. Several economic agreements were reached in the presence of the politicians. The public broadcaster, China Central Television (CCTV), published a report from the meeting. Xi Jinping emphasized that Poland is an important country in Europe, and Andrzej Duda is "an old and good friend of the Chinese people who has long been committed to promoting the development of Chinese-Polish relations, which he appreciates," according to the CCTV website. The Chinese leader further stated that the key to maintaining good relations between Beijing and Warsaw is, among other things, "jointly opposing the Cold War mentality and the confrontation of camps." China hopes for cooperation on issues such as trade, agriculture, new technologies, green industry, and clean energy.

"It is a great honor for me that the President calls me a friend and that I can work with the President to develop bilateral relations", Andrzej Duda said to Xi Jinping, according to a report by China Central Television (CCTV).

On September 12, 2025, Polish government closed all border crossings with Belarus, citing security concerns related to Belarusian-Russian military exercises. This significantly weakened the key transport corridor from China to Europe through Poland, and China launched alternative route. The alternative route could cost Poland approximately $200 million annually in transit fees, VAT, and excise duties on goods (which are currently processed in Germany). Małaszewice could lose its key position as a major hub, and rail transport (which accounts for 3.7% of China-EU trade) is of strategic importance to the economy. The closure of the railway crossing drew sharp criticism from Polish right-wing circles, which deemed the actions of Donald Tusk’s pro-European government populist, arguing that the move was intended to hinder transport links and marginalize the Polish railway crossing to the benefit of Germany—a country with which Tusk maintains close ties. The polish-Chinese railway crossing reopened after a temporary closure and consultations of representatives of both countries. The Chinese side stated that consultations with President Karol Nawrocki brought positive results, and Minister Radosław Sikorski was ignored. On September 25, the railway crossing was reopened.

In March 2026, Polish politician Grzegorz Braun, during his speech at the conference "Sovereign Policy of Central European States", publicly addressed the Chinese ambassador, Cai Ge, who was present in the room, with the words: "I bow to you, Mr. Ambassador," and then told him: "I am extremely happy and satisfied that China exists on this planet. Because China has the ability to influence the fate of the world by its very existence." The Polish politician delivered a radical speech titled "Brussels or Bratislava?", in which he called on the gathered Eurosceptics to openly cooperate with China, as well as to overthrow the European Union and Ursula von der Leyen, whom he called "Reichsführer", comparing the German President of the European Commission to the commander-in-chief of the SS formation in Nazi Germany.

Well-known Polish publicist, political and economic commentator, Łukasz Warzecha, frequently discusses China in his articles, focusing on economic relations, geopolitics, and the Chinese automotive industry. Key themes in his articles include the Chinese automotive industry. Warzecha expresses admiration for the development of the Chinese automotive industry, believing that Chinese electric cars are "a different story," superior in quality and technology compared to their European counterparts, and He believes that European policy towards them is weak. He also criticized the administrative ban on vehicles entering military facilities if they are equipped with smart systems capable recording their surroundings. In his view, the decision lacked a detailed justification. All that is known is that it aims to mitigate the risk of "uncontrolled data collection" and doesn't apply directly to cars from China, but cars from all countries where such systems are being introduced.. The publicist stated that he would greatly appreciate a comprehensive, book-length analysis of the motivations behind such decisions, which he considers populist, often downright detrimental and emotionally. Łukasz Warzecha positively assessed Chinese Foreign Minister Wang Yi's visit to Poland in 2025, pointing out that China is a very important partner and that the talks have yielded concrete results for Polish producers.

According to Polish market statistics, the share of Chinese cars in the total number of newly registered vehicles in Poland has now reached a level in the double digits. One in six new cars sold in Poland currently comes from China. Data from the analytics firm Samar indicate that in June, Chinese-made vehicles accounted for 14.9% (approximately 8,800 units) of new passenger cars registered for the first time in Poland. Meanwhile, Chinese cars captured a record 15.9 percent of the Polish new passenger car market in August.

Poland and China aim to deepen trade and investment cooperation. On August 27, 2026, the 20th session of the Poland-China Joint Commission on Economic Cooperation took place in Beijing. The proceedings were co-chaired by Ling Ji, China’s Vice Minister of Commerce, and Michał Baranowski, Undersecretary of State at the Polish Ministry of Development and Technology. Representatives from the Polish ministries of infrastructure and of agriculture and rural development also participated in the meeting. The talks were held during the year marking the 10th anniversary of the establishment of the comprehensive strategic partnership between Poland and China. Ling Ji emphasized that bilateral trade had grown steadily in recent years, mutual investments had expanded, and the potential for cooperation in transport and logistics connectivity had been gradually unlocked. The Chinese side declared its readiness to increase imports from Poland and support more balanced trade development. China also aims to strengthen cooperation within supply and industrial chains, including in sectors such as new energy, smart manufacturing, logistics, and warehousing. Chinese greenfield investments—which can contribute to job creation, technology transfer, and the strengthening of local supply chains—were a key topic of discussion. Polish-Chinese joint ventures are also among the models being considered for future cooperation. Representatives from both countries highlighted the significant potential for collaboration in sectors such as agri-food, transport and logistics, tourism, robotics, battery technologies, and smart manufacturing.

== Economic relations ==
During the 1950s to 1990s, the two countries conducted economic activities using accounts on government agreements. Their annual trade valued nearly US$1 billion in 1986.

In the 1990s, an agreement on trade payments in convertible foreign exchanges was signed. In 1990, trade dipped from US$0.322 billion to US$0.144 billion in 1991. Bilateral trade began to increase again in 1992.

Trade between Poland and China increased significantly over the years. By 2001, the trade between the two countries was valued at US$1.242 billion, up 29.5% from 2000.

The countries' economic relations revolve primarily around environmental protection, finance, agricultural technology, and the copper and coal industries. It has also recently started to include high technology, clean energy, labour, services and infrastructure.

In 2008, Poland's exports to China totaled approximately US$1 billion, and its imports from China amounted to about US$11 billion.

Poland joined the Belt and Road Initiative in 2015.

== Resident diplomatic missions ==
of China in Poland

- Warsaw (Embassy)

of Poland in China

- Beijing (Embassy)
- Guangzhou (Consulate-General)
- Hong Kong (Consulate-General)
- Shanghai (Consulate-General)

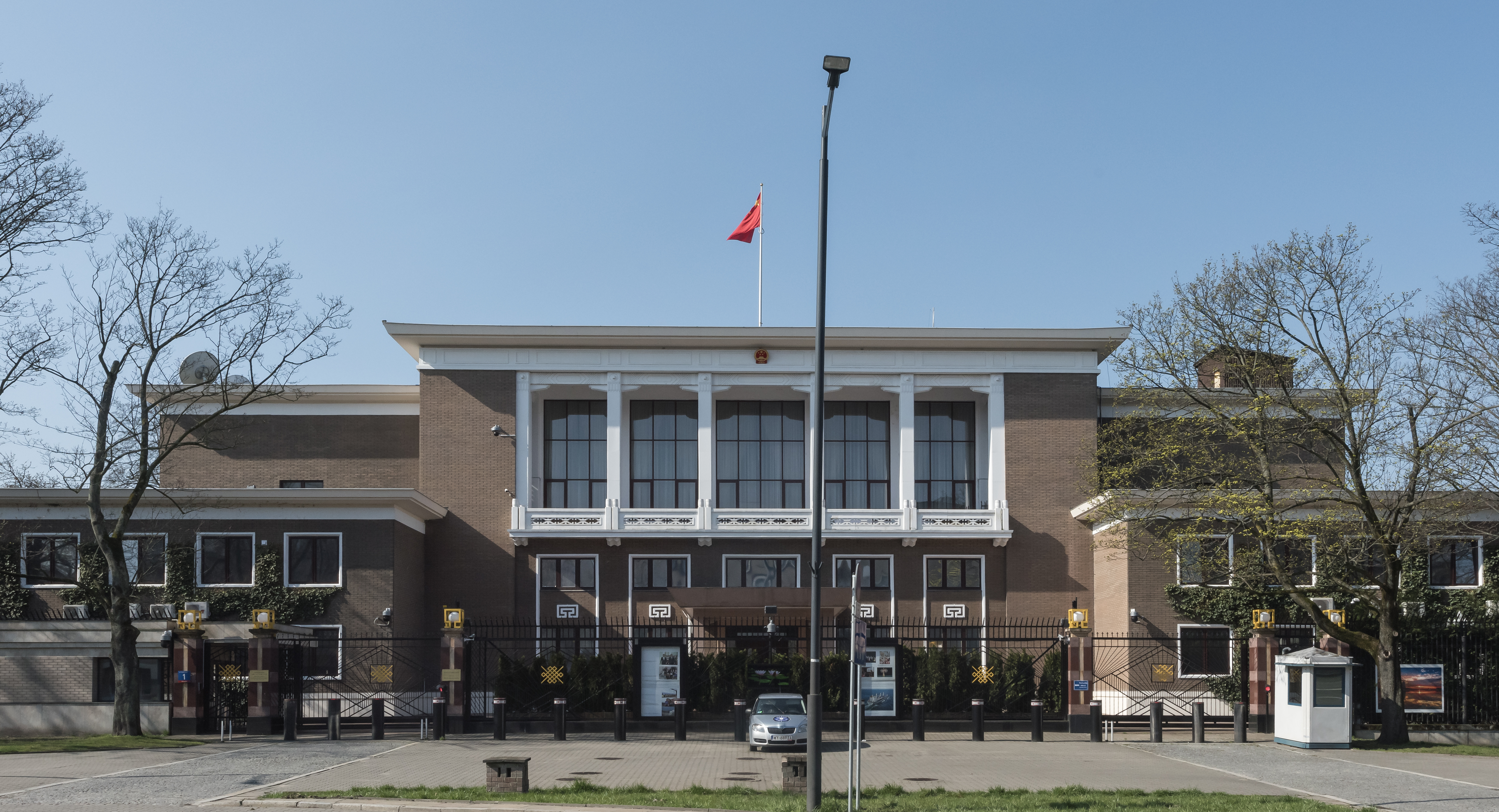
Embassy of China in Warsaw
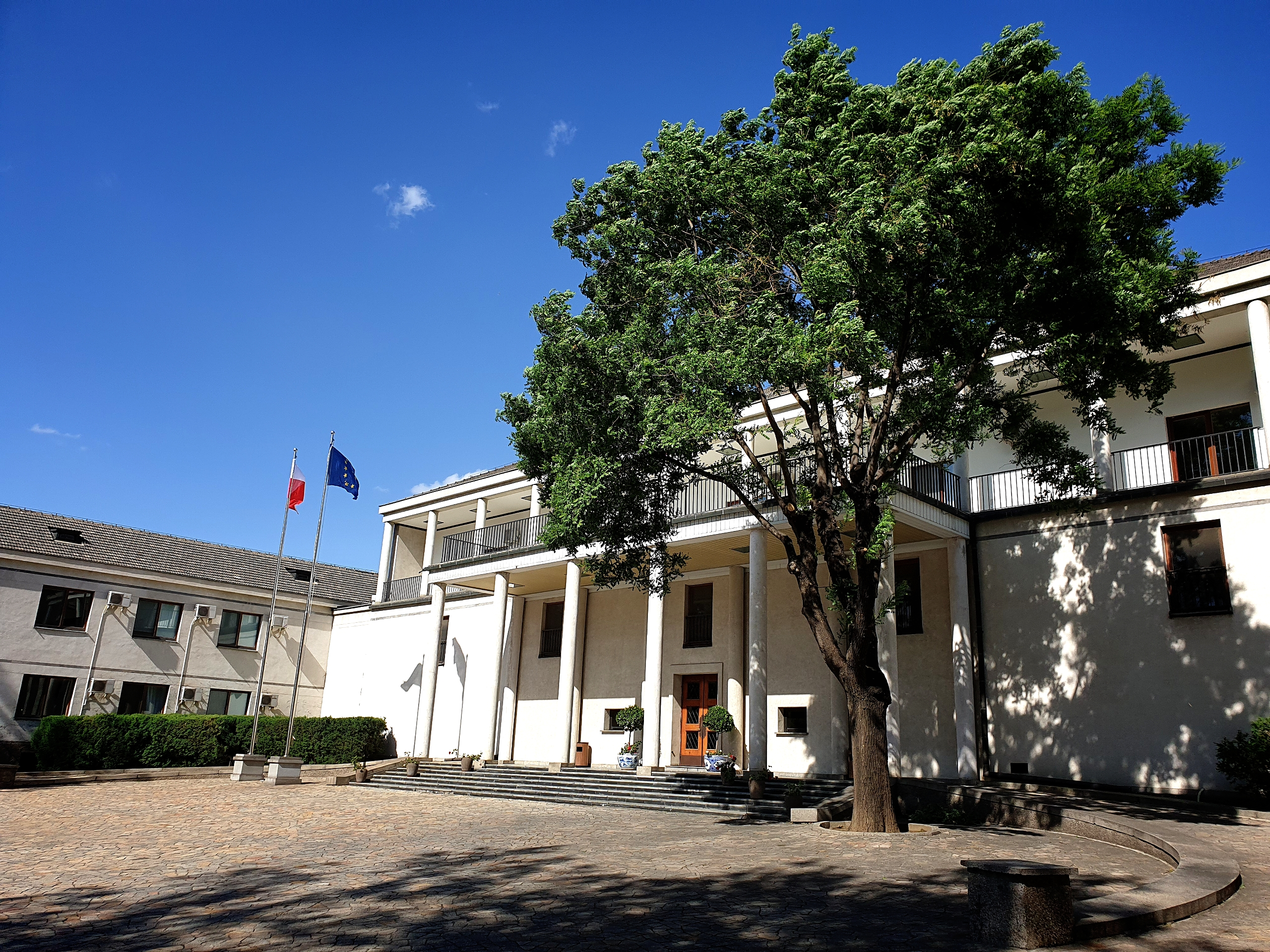
Embassy of Poland in Beijing

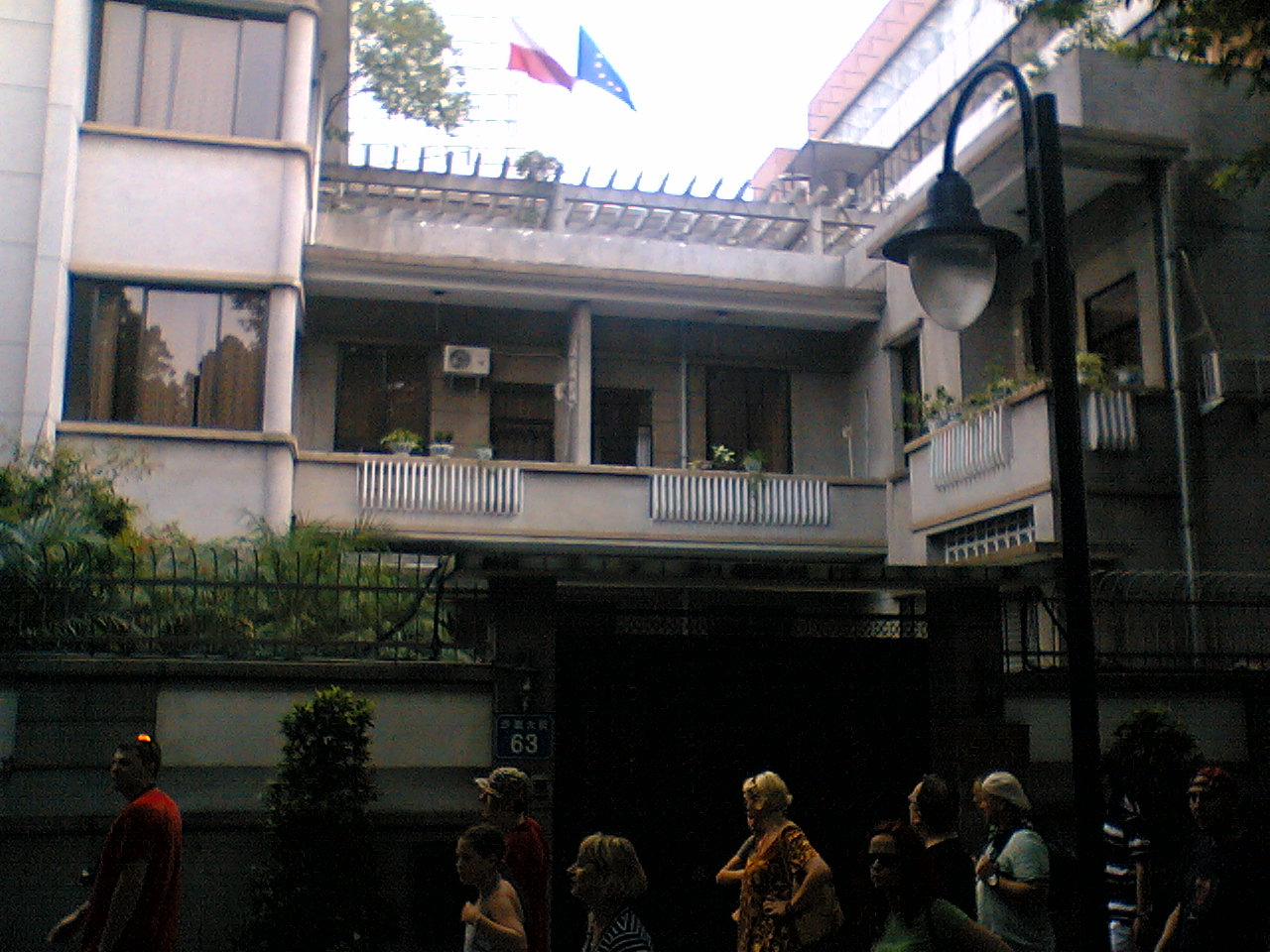
Consulate-General of Poland in Guangzhou

Hopewell Centre hosting the Consulate-General of Poland in Hong Kong

== Public opinion ==
In a survey conducted by the National Research Group (Ogólnopolska Grupa Badawcza) on behalf of the National Polish-American Foundation, Polish citizens were asked which country would be the leading power of the 21st century. In response, 51% of those surveyed identified China as the power of the future, while only 34% saw the USA in that role, which is also linked to a significant decline in Poles' fondness for Americans. Meanwhile, 15% of respondents believed that neither of the two nations would be the leading power.

A July 2026 Public First study for POLITICO found that 44% of Poles support a dual-track strategy combining defense ties with the US and economic cooperation with China. The poll also indicates that 35% of Poles view China as Europe’s most important future trading partner, reflecting the growing divide between Washington and Beijing.

Results from the IBRiS Institute for Market and Social Research for PAP (Polish Press Agency) show a sharp decline in Poles' favorable view of the USA, alongside a rise in positive sentiment toward China. The poll reveals that 41% of Poles hold a positive view of China, 9% a negative one, and 50% are neutral. IBRiS notes that the percentage of positive views regarding China rose in 2026 (41% compared to 30% in 2023), alongside a decline in negative assessments. "At the same time, as many as half of the respondents express an neutral attitude toward this state, suggesting that Poles increasingly view China not in emotional terms, but rather as a significant economic and political player" - the report highlights.

== See also ==
- Poles in China
- Foreign relations of China
- Foreign relations of Poland
