= Poles in China =

Polish diaspora in China

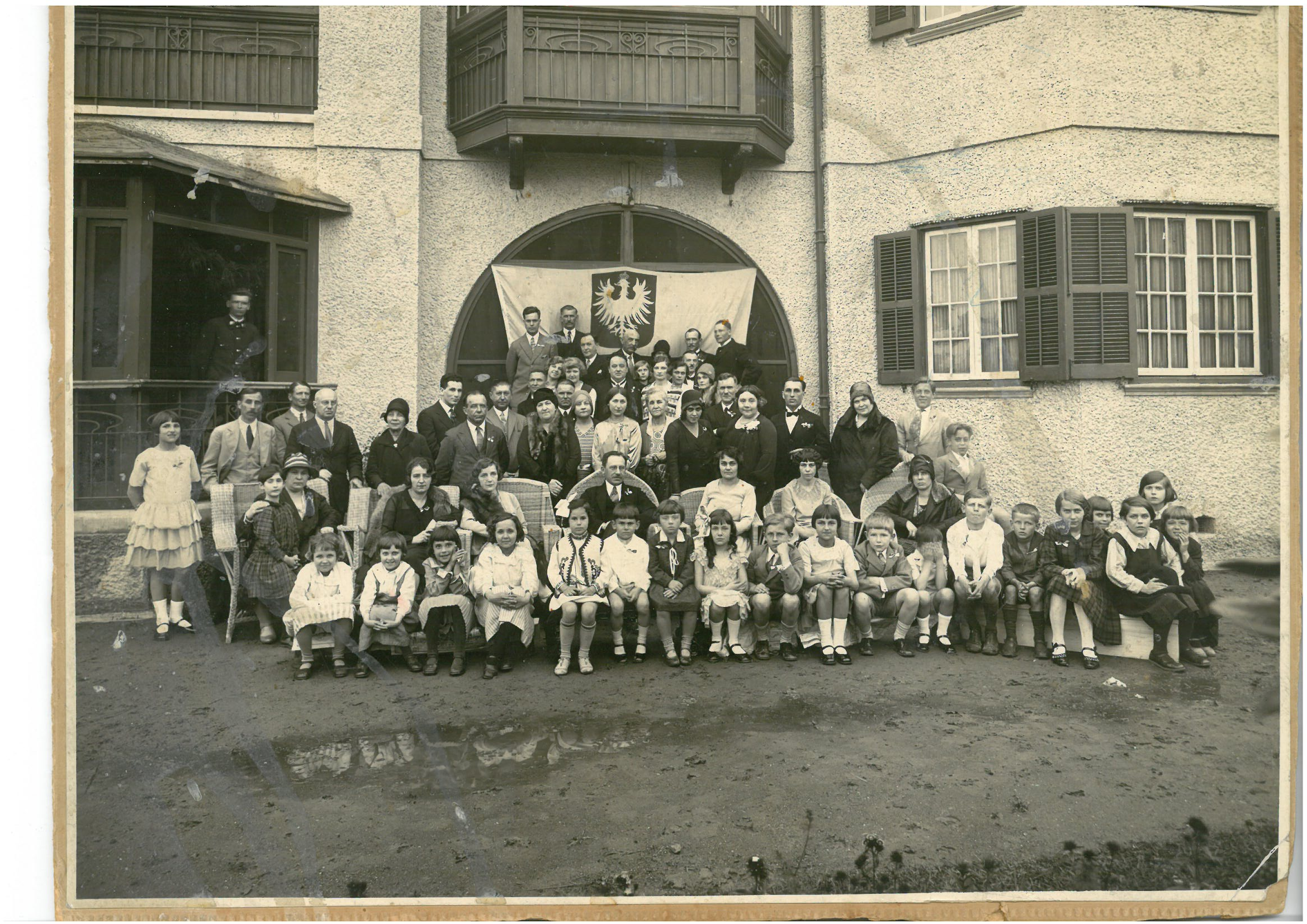
- Poles in Shanghai, c. 1931

Total population
- 1,000 (2012, est.)

Regions with significant populations
- Beijing, Guangzhou, Hong Kong, Shanghai historically also: Harbin, Hailar, Tianjin

Religion
- Christianity and Judaism

Poles in China form a small population, estimated at 1,000 (as of 2012) and mostly concentrated in the major cities of Beijing, Guangzhou, Hong Kong and Shanghai (historically also: Harbin, Hailar, Tianjin). First noted Polish people lived in China in the 17th century.

== History ==
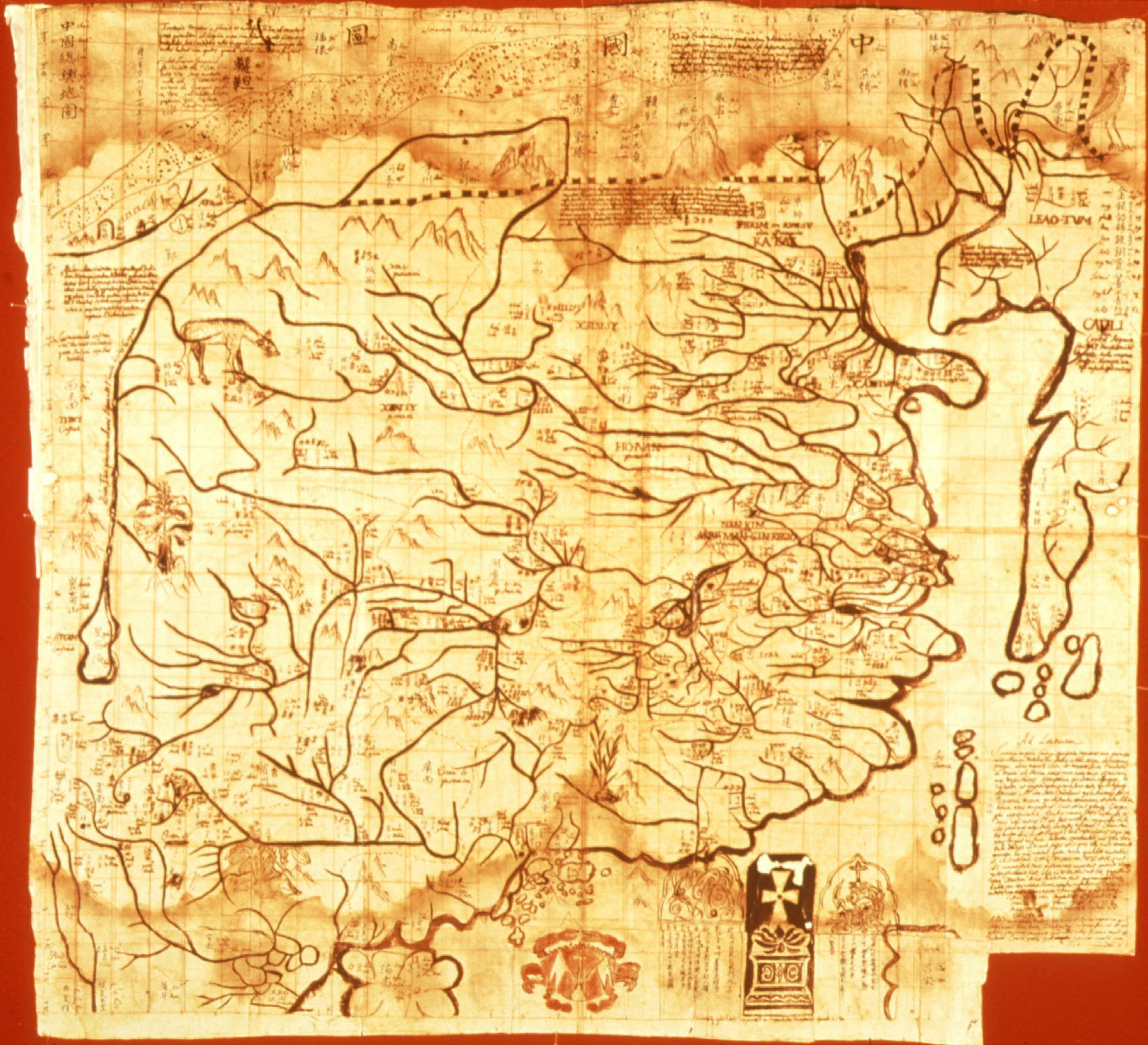
17th-century map of China by Polish Jesuit Michał Boym, the first such accurate map of China in Europe's history

In the mid-17th century, notable Polish Jesuit missionaries Michał Boym and Jan Mikołaj Smogulecki arrived to China. Boym significantly expanded the knowledge of China in Europe with his works, among which were the pioneering botany book Flora Sinensis and detailed maps of China. He also introduced Chinese medicine in Europe, including the analysis of the pulse. Smogulecki taught European mathematics and astronomy in China, and introduced logarithms to China. Both Boym and Smogulecki had contacts with the Imperial Court of China.

In the 1820s and 1830s, Polish physician Józef Wojciechowski was active in Beijing, and became renown for successfully curing a prince from the imperial court deemed incurably ill by local doctors, for which he was honoured with a memorial in Beijing in 1829.

In the late 19th century and early 20th century, when Poland remained partitioned and occupied by neighbouring powers, thousands of Polish emigrants, including engineers, architects, doctors, teachers, many of them political refugees, settled in Manchuria (Northeast China) and greatly contributed to the foundation and development of the Chinese Eastern Railway and the city of Harbin. The founder of the city was Polish engineer Adam Szydłowski, who also was Harbin's first mayor, while the city's layout was planned by Polish engineer Stanisław Jokisz, and other Polish engineers were also responsible for its construction. Poles established a prosperous and influential community in the city, with Polish press, schools, organizations, churches (including the present-day Sacred Heart of Jesus Cathedral) and sports teams, and peacefully co-existed with the city's other ethnicities including the Chinese. Many Poles were employed at the Chinese Eastern Railway, which was managed at the time by Polish railway engineer Stanisław Kierbedź. Tadeusz Nowkuński was the head physician of the central hospital of the Chinese Eastern Railway, active in fighting the plague and cholera epidemics in Manchuria. Poles introduced sugar beet cultivation to China and established the country's first brewery, now known as the Harbin Brewery. Poles also established the first steam mills, metallurgical plants, and furniture factories in Manchuria. Several Polish writers, including Teodor Parnicki, Edward Kajdański and Kazimierz Grochowski, either were born or spent part of their childhood or adulthood in Harbin, before eventually moving to Poland, where they popularized knowledge about China and East Asia.

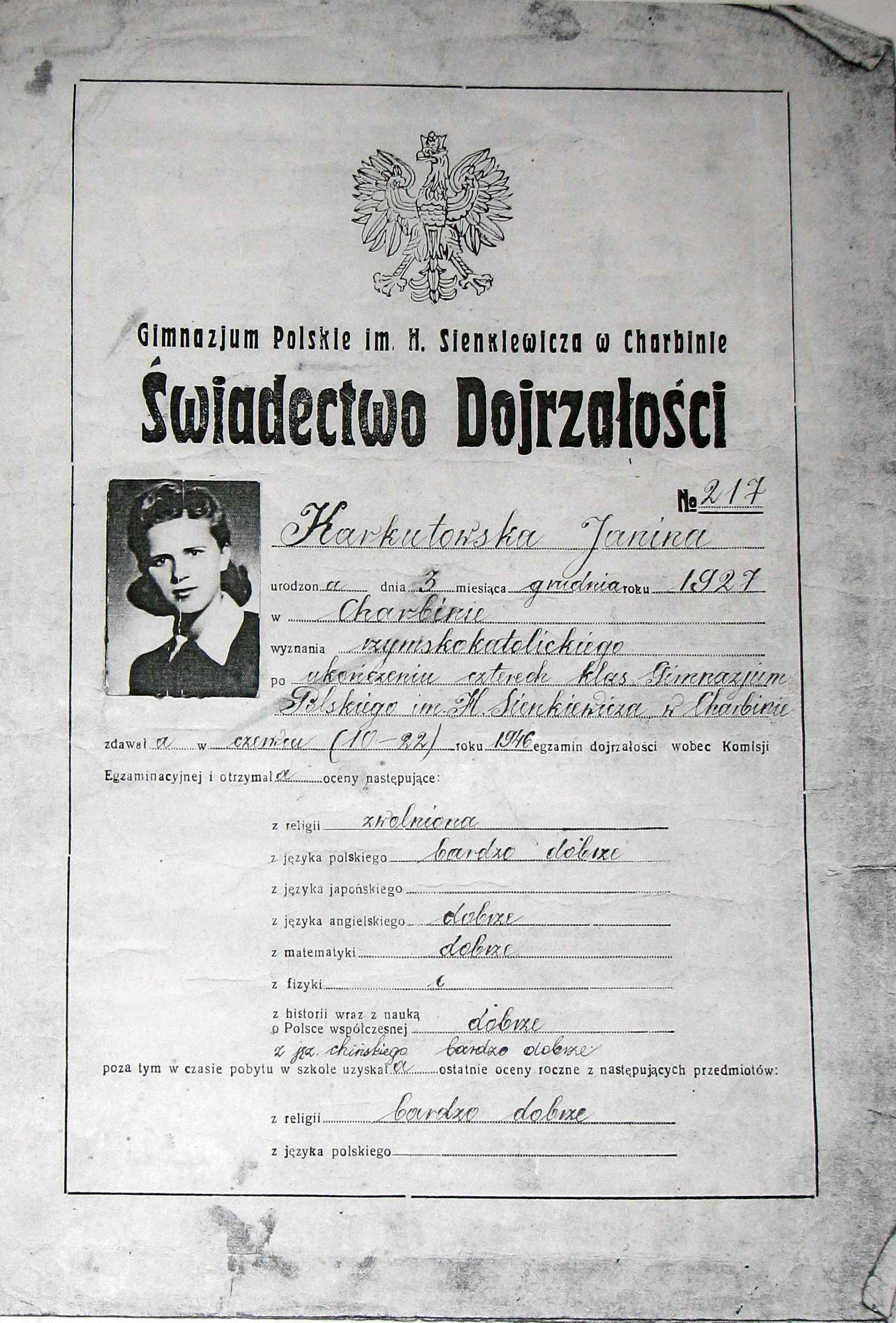
A 1946 matura certificate of the Polish Gymnasium in Harbin

The largest Polish communities in China, outside of Harbin, were in Shanghai, Hailar and Tianjin, and numbered about 500, 100 and 100, respectively. The first Polish organizations in Shanghai and Hailar were established in 1917 and 1918, respectively. Poles in Hailar also had a Catholic church, and a Polish library and school, although the school was closed in 1922 after many Poles left for Poland. The Polish community in Tianjin was considered the wealthiest of the Polish communities in China in the 1920s, and among its members were industrialists, merchants and employees of foreign banks and enterprises, plus some refugees from Russian exile. As of 1929, some 5,000 Poles still lived in China. The Polish community in Harbin remained strong, until many Poles gradually left for Poland in the 1930s, and the remaining Poles were mostly repatriated to Poland by the Polish government in 1949.

== Notable people ==
- Jan Mikołaj Smogulecki (1610–1656), Jesuit missionary, scholar
- Michał Boym (c. 1612–1659), Jesuit missionary, scientist and explorer
- Józef Wojciechowski (1793–1850), physician
- Adam Szydłowski (1860–1916), engineer, co-founder and first mayor of Harbin
- Kazimierz Grochowski (1873-1937), mining engineer, explorer, geologist, ethnographer, archaeologist, writer
- Ludwik Rajchman (1881–1965), physician and bacteriologist, advisor of Chiang Kai-shek and T. V. Soong
- Teodor Parnicki (1908–1988), writer

== See also ==
- China–Poland relations
- Polish diaspora
- Immigration to China
- Chinese People in Poland

== Bibliography ==
- Grochowski, Kazimierz (1928). Polacy na Dalekim Wschodzie (in Polish). Harbin.
