= Grochowski =

Grochowski (Polish pronunciation: [ɡrɔˈxɔfski]; feminine: Grochowska; plural: Grochowscy) is a Polish surname. It appears in various forms when transliterated from Cyrillic alphabets.

Language	Masculine	Feminine
Polish	Grochowski	Grochowska
Russian (Romanization)	Гроховский (Grokhovsky, Grokhovskiy, Grokhovskij)	Гроховская (Grokhovskaya, Grokhovskaia, Grokhovskaja)
Ukrainian (Romanization)	Гроховський (Hrokhovskyi, Hrokhovskyy, Hrokhovskyj)	Гроховська (Hrokhovska)

== People ==
- Achacy Grochowski (died 1633), Polish Catholic bishop
- Agnieszka Grochowska (born 1979), Polish actress
- Gerd Grochowski (1956–2017), German opera singer
- John Grochowski (born c. 1952), American author
- Kazimierz Grochowski (1873–1937) Polish explorer and geologist
- Leon Grochowski (1886–1969), Polish Catholic bishop
- Stanisław Grochowski (died 1645), Polish Catholic bishop

== Other ==
- 21614 Grochowski, asteroid
