= Chipolbrok =

Chinese-Polish shipping company

Chipolbrok 中波公司 Chinese-Polish Joint Stock Shipping Company in Shanghai
- Company type: State-owned enterprise
- Industry: Transportation
- Founded: 1951
- Founder: governments of PRC and Poland
- Headquarters: Shanghai, China
- Area served: Worldwide
- Services: Freight forwarding
- Website: www.chipolbrok.com.cn

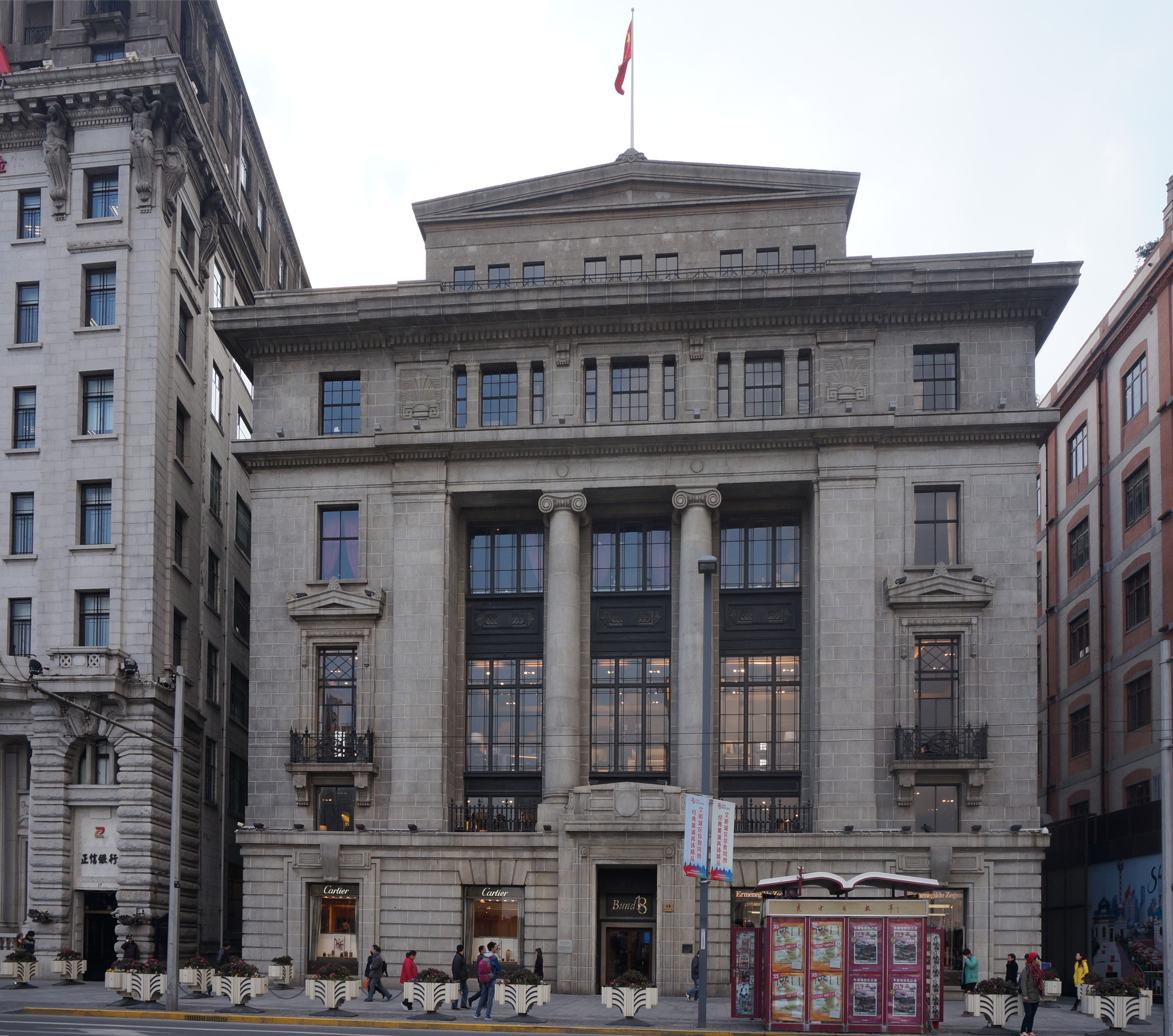
old HQ of Chipolbrok on The Bund in Shanghai (1962-1998)

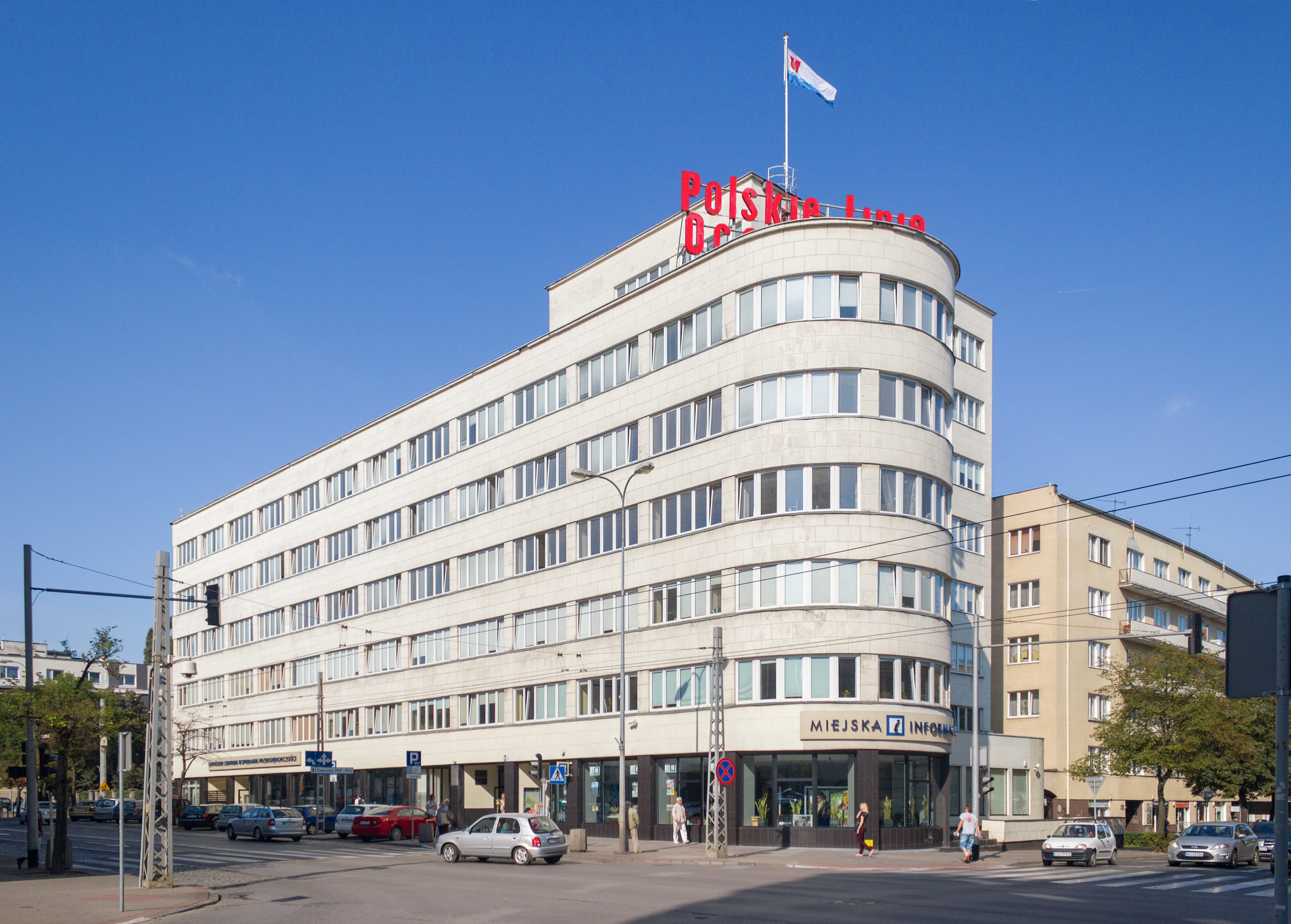
old Branch Office of Chipolbrok in Gdynia (1951-1991)

Chipolbrok (中波公司) is a Chinese-Polish Joint Stock Shipping Company in Shanghai (Chińsko-Polskie Towarzystwo Okrętowe S.A. w Szanghaju, 中波轮船股份公司, Zhongbo Steamship Co. Ltd.) - established in 1951 in Tianjin and Gdynia as a "Chinese-Polish Enterprise of Shipbrokers" on the basis of an agreement between Poland and China in order to establish a connection by sea between Chinese and Polish ports. The role of shareholders is fulfilled by the governments of Poland and China, represented by the ministers of transport of both countries. Chipolbrok is the oldest Chinese deep-sea shipowner and the first enterprise with foreign capital in the People's Republic of China. Its creation enabled the development of a transport network isolated from China, connecting it with the world trade and services market.

== Subsidiaries ==
- Sinepol Shipping & Agency BV, Rotterdam (1992-)
- Chipolbal Shipping Pte Ltd., Singapore (1993-)
- Chipol International Shipping Agency, Shanghai (1994-)
- Shanghai Chipol International Logistics Co. Ltd., Shanghai (1996-)
- Chipol Real Estate (Shanghai) Co., Ltd., Shanghai (1998-)
- POLBROK – Agency and International Forwarding Ltd., Gdynia (1999-)
- Chipol Real Estate (Shanghai) Co. Ltd., Gdynia (1999-)
- Chipolbrok-Investment Sp. z o.o., Gdynia (2001-)
- Chipolbrok America Inc., Houston (2004-)
- Chinese-Polish (Beijing) International Forwarding Co. Ltd., Peking (2009-)
- CENTRUM Sopot Sp. z o.o., Sopot

== Headquarters ==
The first headquarters was in Tianjin in the area of "Five Great Avenues" (五大道, Wǔ Dàdào) at Ma Chang Dao 158 (馬場道) (1951-1953), then at Chongqing Rd. 23 (重庆路) (1953-1962). After moving the headquarters to Shanghai, it was first located in a building reminiscent of the Renaissance style (designed by Palmer & Turner), the former headquarters of The Chartered Bank of India, Australia and China (麦加利 银行大楼) from 1922 at The Bund, official address - Chung Shan Rd 18 (中山路), and in 1998 in the building Gong Shang Lian (floors 26–28), also called Heng Ji Plaza (恒积大厦), at Yan An Rd. E. 55 (延安路).
