= Sumxu =

Chinese mythological creature

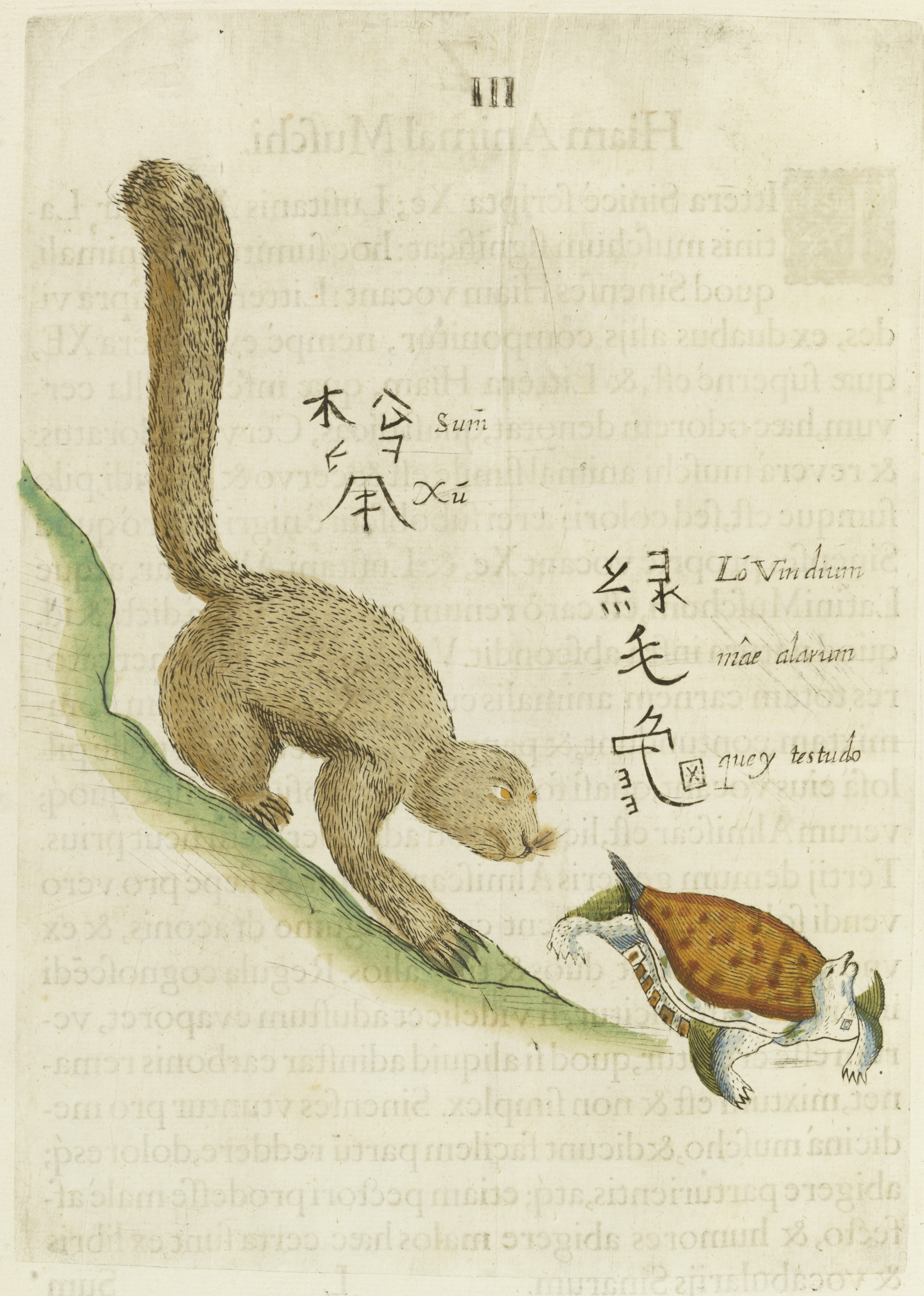
Sumxu (松鼠, song shu) chasing a green-haired turtle (绿毛龟, Lü mao gui), in Michael Boym's Flora Sinensis

The sumxu, Chinese lop-eared cat, drop-eared cat, droop-eared cat, or hanging-ear cat, all names referring to its characteristic feature of pendulous ears, was a possibly mythical, long-haired, lop-eared type of cat or cat-like creature, now considered extinct, if it ever actually existed. The descriptions are based on reports from travellers, on a live specimen reportedly taken to Hamburg by a sailor, and on a taxidermy specimen exhibited in Germany. The cats were supposedly valued as pets, but was also described as a food animal. The last reported Chinese lop-eared cat was in 1938. It is believed by some to have been a mutation similar to that found in the Scottish Fold.

Historical studies on early modern Chinese sources demonstrated that the name sumxu (松鼠, song shu) as understood by Michał Boym (c. 1612–1659) in his Flora Sinensis (1656) originally referred to the Siberian weasel (despite the fact that it is now used to name animals from the Sciuridae family), but a series of mistranslations might have caused the name to be applied to the alleged cat or cat-like animal.

== Description ==
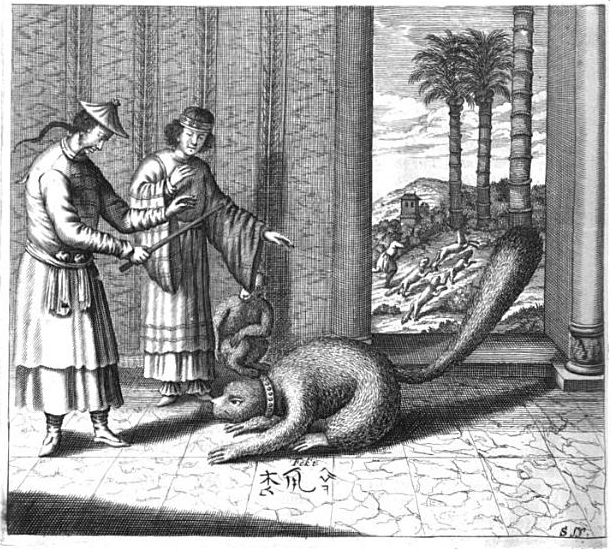
Sumxu, described as "similar to cats" in Athanasius Kircher's China Illustrata. The Chinese caption, 松鼠, has suffered in the process of being copied by an artist not familiar with Chinese script

Michał Boym, a Polish Jesuit missionary to south China, was the first Westerner to describe the sumxu in his illustrated book Flora Sinensis. Sum xu was the Portuguese rendering of song shu, meaning "pine rat" and the description indicated the Siberian weasel (Mustela sibirica) widespread in East Asia. The text in Boym's treatise must have been based on descriptions of this animal prevalent in Chinese scholarly works in the early modern period, all applying the term song shu to indicate members of the same species. The white lop-eared cat, however, was said to be found in a northern region of the country. Later authors, copying and translating from early natural histories, conflated the two animals.

Italian Jesuit Martino Martini had visited China in the 1650s and published Novus Atlas Sinensis in 1655. In the section on Peking Province, Martini described a variety of cossetted white, long-haired and long-eared cats found in the region. The breed was once found in region around Peking and probably resembled a long-haired Scottish Fold. His description of white, droop-eared companion cats was copied in 1673 by John Ogilby and by later authors.

An engraving from Athanasius Kircher's book China Monumentis, Qua Sacris qua Profanis (1666) describes the sumxu as cat-like, but the illustration resembled a small bear with a bushy tail. The engraving is clearly based on a picture in Boym's Flora Sinensis, where the picture is captioned as 松鼠 in Chinese (this is Chinese for "squirrel"; the word is transcribed songshu in modern Hanyu Pinyin, but sumxu was the standard way of transcribing these syllables in the 17th century Jesuit literature) and sum xu in Latin. Kircher's description, if not sheer fantasy, may have been based on reports of other writers (as detailed below) who refer to the creature as a droop-eared cat.

In 1736–37, Martini's work was superseded by that of French Jesuit du Halde's works on the Chinese Empire. This included the description of the white droop-eared cat of Peking Province from Martini's book and remained the standard reference book for many years, being copied by other authors. German naturalist Alfred Brehm gave a very detailed description of the Chinese lop-eared cat in 1796, based on a specimen said to have been brought back from China by a traveller.

In volume 4 of his Histoire Naturelle (c. 1767), Georges Louis Leclerc, Comte de Buffon, mentioned the pendulous-eared cats of Pe-chi-ly in China and he was unsure whether the black or yellow sumxu was a cat or some other domesticated animal used to control rats. His description was included in The Natural History of The Cat (Volume 4 of Histoire Naturelle, as translated into English by William Smellie in 1781):

Our domestic cats, though they differ in colour, form no distinct races. The climates of Spain and Syria have alone produced permanent varieties: To these may be added the climate of Pe-chi-ly in China, where the cats have long hair and pendulous ears, and are the favourites of the ladies. These domestic cats with pendulous ears, of which we have full descriptions, are still farther removed from the wild and primitive race, than those whose ears are erect....

I formerly remarked, that, in China, there were cats with pendulous ears. This variety is not found anywhere else, and perhaps it is an animal of a different species; for travellers, when mentioning an animal called Sumxu, which is entirely domestic, say, that they can compare it to nothing but the cat, with which it has a great resemblance. Its colour is black or yellow, and its hair very bright and glittering. The Chinese put silver collars about the necks of these animals, and render them extremely familiar. As they are not common, they give a high price, both on account of their beauty, and because they destroy rats.

Buffon's source was abbé Prevôt (written in French), whose source was John Green (written in English), whose source was French Jesuit de Halde (written in French), whose source was Martini's 1655 work. By 1777, Buffon had concluded the lop-eared cat was a different species than the domestic cat and that it might therefore be the cat-like marten called the sumxu. Hence the name sumxu (the yellow-throated marten found in south China) incorrectly became attached to an alleged breed of domestic cat or cat-like animal found in a northern region. He reached this conclusion because de Halde had omitted mention in his translation that the lop-eared cats were milk-white. Boym's illustration of the sumxu did not draw attention to its ears, whereas Martini described pendulous ears as the defining feature of the white cats of Pe-chi-ly. This was perpetuated through the 19th and early 20th centuries, especially by cat fanciers looking for new and exotic cats to import.

In Variation of Animals and Plants under Domestication, Charles Darwin refers briefly to a drooping eared race of cats in China. In The Cat by Lady Cust (1870) there is this brief description:

Bosman relates that in the province of Pe-chily, in China, there are cats with long hair and drooping ears, which are in great favour with the Chinese ladies; others say this is not a cat but an animal called 'Samxces'.

In 1885, the writer Gaston Percheron suggested the lop-eared cat might be a hybrid between the cat and a marten. In 1926, cat fancier Lilian J. Veley wrote in the magazine Cat Gossip that the Siamese cat (described in early breed standards as sable and dun in colour) was linked to the marten (described as sable and yellow in colour). Percheron's description changed the lop-eared cat from a cossetted pet fed on delicacies to an animal consumed as a delicacy and this, along with the erroneous use of the sumxu name, was also perpetuated by later authors.

Jean Bungartz also described the Chinese lop-eared cat or hanging-ear cat, as a food animal and with much Lamarckian supposition, in his work Die Hauskatze, ihre Rassen und Varietäten (Housecats, Their Races and Varieties) from Illustriertes Katzenbuch (An Illustrated Book of Cats) in Berlin in 1896:

The Chinese or Lop-Eared cat is most interesting, because it provides proof that by continual disuse of an organ, the organ withers. With the Chinese cat the hearing and ears have deteriorated. Michel says the Chinese, not only admire the cat in porcelain, but also value it for culinary reasons. The cats are regarded as special morsels and enjoyed particularly with noodles or with rice. This cat is bred particularly for the purpose of meat production, and is a preferred Chinese morsel; this is not unusual if one considers that the Chinese consume much the sight of which revolts the stomachs of Europeans. The poor creature is confined in small bamboo cages and fattened like a goose on plentiful portions. There is extensive trade with other parts of Asia and the canny Chinese allow no tomcats to be exported so there is no interference in this lucrative source of income.

Due to the restrictive conditions that have deprived the cat of its actual use, its hearing has decreased because it is no longer needed for hunting its own food. With no need for watchfulness, it had no need of sharp hearing to listen for hidden things so its hearing became blunted and as a natural consequence its ears lost their upright nature, gradually becoming lower and becoming the hanging ear that is now the characteristic feature of the Chinese cat. At first impression this is a surprising and amusing look, but this impression is lost with closer examination. If one ignores the characteristic of the ears, one sees a beauty similar to the Angora cat: a long, close coat of hair, albeit less rich, covers the body. The hair is silky-soft and shining and the colour is usually isabelline or a dirty white yellow, although some have the usual colouring of the common house-cat. In size it is considerably larger and stronger than a housecat. The ears hang completely, as with our hunting dogs and are large in relation to the cat.

Although the Chinese cat is found in considerable numbers in its homeland, it is rarely found at European animal markets. Only one such cat has reached us in the flesh; we acquired this years ago when a sailor returning from China brought it into Hamburg. The accompanying illustration is based on this cat. In character it is like the Angora cat and somewhat languid. It prefer to live by a warm fire, is rather sensitive to flattery, hears badly and is at its most animated when given milk or food. Apart from its unusual ears, it has no really attractive characteristics and is a curious specimen of housecat.

In Frances Simpson's The Book of the Cat (1903), contributing author H. C. Brooke wrote:

There is said to be a variety of Chinese cat which is remarkable for its pendent ears. We have never been able to ascertain anything definite with regard to this variety. Some years back a class was provided for them at a certain Continental cat show, and we went across in the hope of seeing, and if possible acquiring, some specimens; but alas the class was empty! We have seen a stuffed specimen in a Continental museum, which was a half long-haired cat, the ears being pendent down the sides of the head instead of erect; but do not attach much value to this.

Elsewhere he said that the stuffed specimen, which he saw in 1882, was "half-coated with yellowish fur", and that it might have been a fake or a cat with its ears deformed by canker.

In 1926, Brooke wrote in Cat Gossip that for many years Continental cat shows had offered prizes for the drop-eared Chinese cat. On each occasion, the cat failed to materialise and Brooke considered it to be mythical. Other writers suggested the folded or crumpled ears were the result of damage or hematomas. Brooke wrote that although no one ever saw the cat itself, one always met "someone who knows someone whose friend has often seen them". Brooke himself had been assured by a Chinese gentleman he had met only once that "he knew them well".

Brooke and several other cat fanciers contacted the Chinese Embassy in the UK, and Carl Hagenbeck's animal exchange in Hamburg and also a "certain well-known author, who has lived for years in China and knows that country well", but their enquiries bore no fruit. The search for this cat became so intense in the 1920s that the American Express Company instructed their representatives at Shanghai and Peking to make enquiries with the wild animal dealers who supplied zoos. They also had no success finding a Chinese lop-eared cat for cat fanciers in the West. With all avenues of enquiry finally exhausted, Brooke declared the Chinese lop-eared cat extinct.

The last reported sighting of the Chinese lop-eared cat was in 1938 when a droop-eared cat was imported from China. On that last occasion the mutation was believed to occur only in white long-haired cats.

== Notes ==
- Brooke, H.C., 1926 – Cat Gossip (magazine)
- Bungartz, Jean, 1896 – Die Hauskatze, ihre Rassen und Varietäten (Housecats, Their Races and Varieties) from Illustriertes Katzenbuch (An Illustrated Book of Cats)
- Lady Cust, 1870 - The Cat
- Darwin, Charles - Variation of Animals and Plants Under Domestication
- Kircheri, Athanasii, 1666 - China Monumentis, Qua Sacris qua Profanis
- Martini, Martino, 1655 - Novus Atlas Sinensis
- Percheron, Gaston, 1885 - The Cat: Natural History, Husbandry ("Hygiene") and Illnesses
- Leclerc, Georges Louis (Comte de Buffon), 1767 - Histoire Naturelle Vol IV: The Natural History of The Cat
- Simpson, Frances (editor), 1903 - The Book of the Cat
- Some material used from Messybeast.com with permission.
