= Five Great Avenues =

Area of Tianjin, China

Coordinates: 39°06′34″N 117°11′48″E

Five Great Avenues (五大道; Wǔdàdào; Wudadao, literally "The Five Avenues") is a tourist and up-scale residential area in Heping District, Tianjin, China.

Wudadao is located in the south of the downtown Tianjin. It contains parallel streets from east to west named after five cities of southwest China, namely Chongqing, Changde, Dali, Munan, and Machang. Local Tianjinese people call the area "The Five Avenues". There are over 2000 buildings of all kinds from the architecture of Britain, France, Italy, Germany, and Spain. Over 300 houses have been occupied by celebrities.

Its colourful architectural styles range from the Renaissance, Greek, Gothic, Romantic and Eclectic. The second part is the residential area, with the first small Western-style residential area for foreign people who opened up concessions, whose residence next to the office area, close to Jiefang Road, around the former Italian concession in the east of Marco Polo Plaza.

In the 20th century, Tianjin had come to occupy a particular position in China: On the one hand, social and political unrest made concessions a haven for ousted politicians and businessmen; on the other hand, Tianjin was geographically well-placed for transportation and duty-free customs. Various dignitaries and rich people lived in Tianjin. Living in a small Western-style house was more comfortable and convenient than a traditional courtyard and the Fifth Avenue was located in a prime location of the British concession. The neighbourhood became Tianjin's rich area at that time. Tianjin was the first in terms of the size of its rich area among the affluent cities in modern China.
