= Diplomatic approaches between the courts of John III Sobieski and the Kangxi Emperor =

17th-century contact between Poland and China

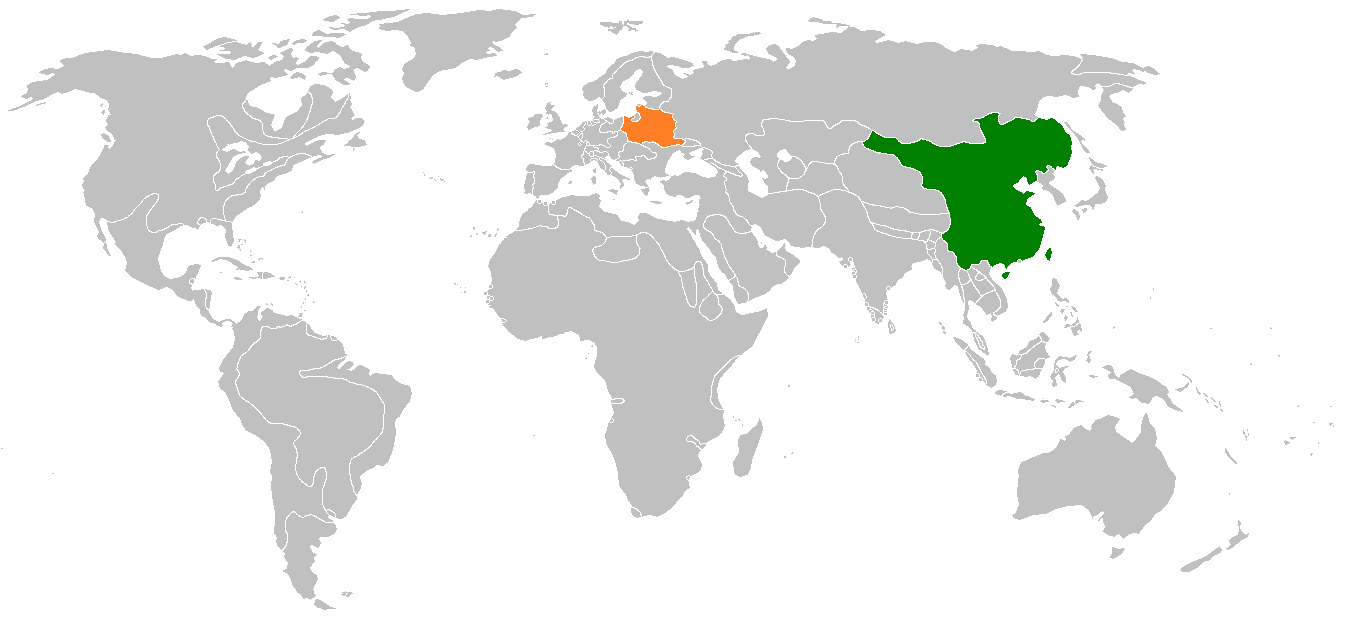
Map of the Qing empire & the Polish-Lithuanian Commonwealth

One of the first modern-style diplomacy attempts in the Chinese context was the one made by John III Sobieski of Poland who desired to establish friendly relations with the Kangxi Emperor.

The diplomatic approaches between the courts can be traced to the correspondence between John III himself with a trusted advisor to Kangxi, Flemish Jesuit Ferdinand Verbiest.

On 17 November 1685 Verbiest sent via Nicola Avancini a congratulatory letter to the King of Poland for his role in the victory over the Ottoman Empire at the Battle of Vienna. It is claimed to be an opening of a “Polish connection”.

Although the victory brought John III fame throughout Europe, at that time the King was seeking it himself. One of his ways was sending royal portraits of him to the courts of various rulers. It is believed that around 1685-87 John III presented his portrait to the Kangxi Emperor. Reportedly, the gift was well received and the Emperor personally responded with a eulogy for the Polish King. The contents of the letter remain unknown.

Verbiest's first letter, however, was inspired by his concern for an overland route via Moscovia and Poland to Europe, which became a pivotal point in the geostrategy of the Jesuits Mission in China.

The concern was shared on the other side of the route. John III solicited the opening of a trade connection with the Far East through Siberia already in 1667 during the negotiations of the Treaty of Andrusovo, expecting Polish or German Jesuits to play a central role in establishing of this path. Although it ended with a fiasco, the King did not abandon this plan. A successful attempt was made while negotiating the Grzymulkowski Treaty on 6 May 1686. Unfortunately the agreement was not honored. It is speculated that Russians have annexed several Chinese provinces within the last five years and wanted to conceal this fact.

The issue of the trade route was closely linked with John III's main intention of reinforcing global security by becoming allies with the Celestial Empire. After the defeat of the Ottoman Empire at the Battle of Vienna, the Tsardom of Russia became the King's new, main concern. Unfortunately for the Polish King, at the time the Qing Emperor must have considered the Treaty of Nerchinsk to be sufficient assurance of peace with the Russian Tsardom. Moreover, the Chinese Empire's international relations at the time were based on the tributary system and all foreigner missions were expected to adopt a posture of subjugation. For Kangxi therefore it must have been unlikely to imagine alliance with a distant, European kingdom as essential in maintaining safety.

Verbiest died on 28 January 1688, 10 months before the date of the last letter of John III Sobieski, which indicated a depth of prior communication between them:

“Joannes Tertius Dei gratia Rex Poloniae…

Venerabilis Pater, devote nobis dilecte. Tametsi tardius per tanta terrarum spatia litterae Paternitatis Vestrae ad nos delatae sint, a tam grato tamen in aula Potentissimi Sinarum Regis Verbi Divini Administro, non potuerunt nisi esse gratissimae. At longe maioris adhuc aestimationis illae amoris et observantiae nobis fuerunt significationes Patrum Societatis, qui in nobilissima illa vinea Apostolica zelo, insignique fructu animarum et Ecclesiae incremento ibidem desudant, quibus vicissim singularem benevolentiam, quam Societatem nostro in Regno complectimur, Devot. Vestris animitus declaramus. Porro quod tantus Sinico – Tartaricus Monarcha, cui maxima pars orbis obtemperat, lubenti animo et effigiem nostram suspexerit et ottomanicam superbiam potentiamque, Superis propitiis, multiplicibus attritam esse victoriis curiosus intellexerit, aeque nobis honorificum ac iucundum esse non inficiamur, immo satisfactionem, quam inde cepimus et grati animi contestationem a Devot. Vestra Eidem Monarchae vicissim exhiberi impense desideramus. Applaudimus insuper Potentissimo Imperatori, quod tot nobilissimis Gentibus terra marique imperet et virtutibus nomen toto orbe celeberrimum impleat, diuturnos Suac M-ti annos, gloriae auctoramenta et omnimodam felicitatem a Supremo Numine auguramur, fidem et fraternam cum eodem amicitiam et sincere ambientes, quam certo nobis pollicemur. In hoc quoque non minimum experimur oblectamentum, quod quemadmodum Divina Providentia Polonicis armis et dexteris ad Christianae Religionis Sanctissimae contra barbaros et infidelissimos hostes defensionem uti dignata est, ita potentissimi et sapientissimi Monarchae protectione veri Dei Opt. Max. et Jesu Christi cultus promoveatur, ac Religiosi Soc. Jesu de Sancta Ecclesia tam bene meriti, Imperiali gratia foveantur. Unde Supremum Numen, novis in dies favoribus illum cumulaturum, tandemque verae lucis radiis eiusdem oculos, mentemque illuminaturum, quo longe amplius Regnum consequi, eoque frui in aeternum possit, speramus. Liber de rebus sinicis nondum in nostram devenit notitiam, gratissimum vero nobis fore confidat, si inposterum distinctissimas relationes, morum praecipue et rerum exoticarum, tum ad Regiones tum ad Personas, sive aulae sive aliorum spectant, quavis ad nos miserit occasione. Caeterum devotis Societatis suffragiis nos, domumque nostram commendatam cupimus.

Datum Jaworowiae, die 16 Novembris anno Domini 1688 Regni vero Nostri XV. Joannes Rex.

The fact that the letter was hand-written by the Polish King himself indicates the great importance he attached to this matter. Although the letter returned unanswered, it has not stopped John III from further attempts of establishing diplomatic ties with the Chinese court. Sobieski continued to exchange letters with Philippus Maria Grimaldi, the successor of Verbiest on the Kangxi's court. John III had high hopes for establishing exotic relations with the Chinese court.

The efforts were also motivated by his interest in the Chinese culture. John III was curious about such matters as Chinese customs, organization of the court (government) or the size of the army. He asked Verbiest these and similar questions seeking reliable and first-hand information.
