= Józef Wojciechowski (physician) =

Polish physician

- Born: 1793
- Died: 7 November 1850 (aged 56–57); Kazan
- Occupation: physician

Józef Wojciechowski (1793–7 November 1850) was a Polish medical doctor and professor.

== Education ==
Born near the town of Lipowiec in the Russian Partition of Poland shortly after the Second Partition of Poland in 1793, Wojciechowski obtained education in Kyiv and Saint Petersburg.

== Life and work ==
From 1820 to 1839 he lived in Qing China, practiced as a physician and researched Chinese medical works. He learned both Manchu and Chinese languages. At first he had no Chinese patients, however, after he cured a Chinese monk, whom Chinese doctors considered incurably ill, he won the trust of the local people, and subsequent successful treatments made his services renowned. His greatest acclaim came when he successfully cured a prince from the imperial court deemed incurably ill by local doctors. In 1829 Wojciechowski was honored by the Qing court with a memorial in Beijing.

In 1844, he became a professor of Manchu and Chinese languages at the Kazan University, yet he continued his practice as a physician.
