= Jan Mikołaj Smogulecki =

Polish nobleman, missionary and scholar (1610–1656)

Jan Mikołaj Smogulecki (1610–1656), of the Grzymała coat of arms, was a Polish nobleman, politician, missionary, scholar and Jesuit credited with introducing logarithms to China.

== Life ==
Smogulecki was born in 1610 in Kraków or Smogulec (sources vary), the son of the starosta of Bydgoszcz, Maciej Smogulecki, and Zofia Zebrzydowska. He began his education about 1621 at a Jesuit school in Braniewo, then continued it from about 1623 at the Lubrański Academy in Poznań. Later he left the Polish-Lithuanian Commonwealth to gain more education abroad. In the years 1626–29 he studied mathematics and astronomy at Freiburg, philosophy in Rome, and law at Padua (where he was also an official representative of the Polish-Lithuanian Commonwealth).

Returning to Poland ca. 1630 or 1631 (sources vary), he joined the royal court and was named starosta of Nakło. He was elected a deputy to the convocation sejm of 1632; then again in 1635. In 1636 he was elected to the Crown Tribunal. In 1634 or 1636 (sources vary) he joined the Jesuit Order, declared his intent to become a missionary in distant lands, and began studies in theology at Kraków.

In 1640 he went to Rome; in 1641 he took holy orders; in 1644 he took monastic vows. In 1645 he traveled from Portugal (where he declined an invitation to join the Portuguese royal court) to Java, India and China to be a missionary.

After a journey during which he fell ill and almost died, in 1646 he arrived in Macao. He studied Chinese language and customs in Jiangnan and Hangzhou. Then he moved to Nanjing and adopted the Chinese name, Mu Ni-co (also spelled Mu Ni-ko, Mu Nike, Mu Nigo; some sources add a third part, Rude, as in "Mu Nigo, Rude"). He began his missionary activities in Nanking, but about 1647 a civil war forced him to move to Jianyang in the Chinese province of Fujian. In the years 1648–51 he worked as a missionary.

He also taught astronomy and mathematics, introducing logarithms to China, and was much respected by Chinese scholars. His fame as a scholar and teacher spread, and in 1653 he was invited by the Shunzhi Emperor to his court in Beijing.

Smogulecki requested permission to leave the court to continue his missionary travels. He went to Manchuria, then to Yunnan, where another civil war made him travel to Guangzhou. He visited the island of Hainan, then returned to the mainland.

On 17 September 1656 he died in Zhaoqing, Guangdong Province. (The city name is variously transcribed as Tszan-King, Zhaojing, Zhaoging Fou; sources vary).

== Works ==
He wrote works about sun spots and eclipses.

He was a teacher of the Chinese scholar and astronomer Xue Fengzuo, who would be the first Chinese to publish work using logarithms. They published True Principles of the Pacing of the Heavens together.

== See also ==
- Michał Piotr Boym
- Andrzej Rudomina
- History of science and technology in China
- Jesuit China missions
- List of Poles
