= Kazimierz Grochowski =

Polish mining engineer, explorer, geologist, ethnologist, archealogist, and writer

Kazimierz Grochowski (1873-1937) was a Polish mining engineer, explorer, geologist, ethnographer, archaeologist, and writer specializing in studies of Siberia, Mongolia, and Manchuria.

== Works ==
- Polacy na Dalekim Wschodzie (1928)
