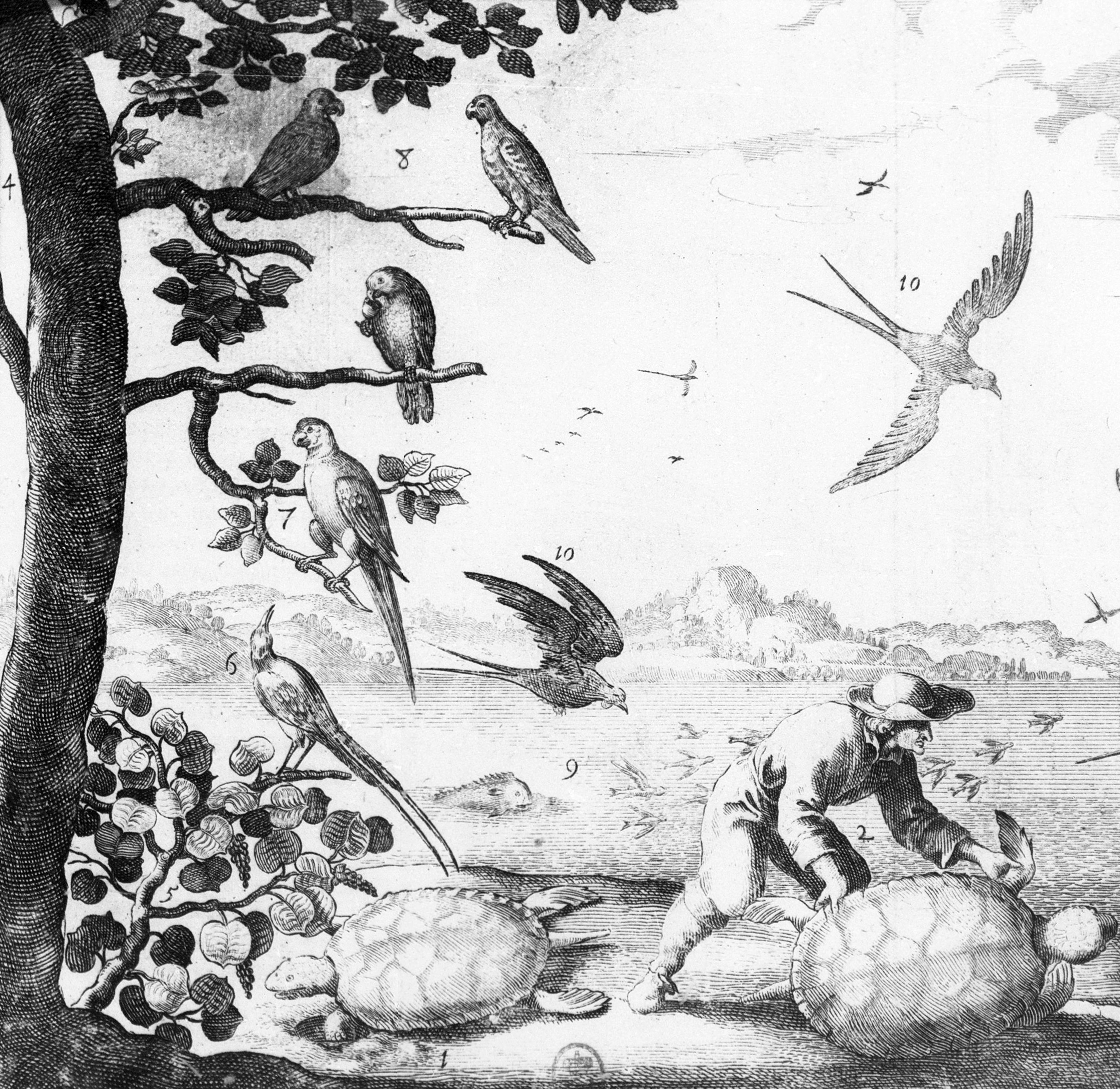
- Du Tertre's 1667 illustration showing three Guadeloupe amazons (8) and one Lesser Antillean macaw (7) on a tree at the left

Conservation status
- Extinct (c. 1779) (IUCN 3.1)

Scientific classification
- Kingdom: Animalia
- Phylum: Chordata
- Class: Aves
- Order: Psittaciformes
- Family: Psittacidae
- Genus: Amazona
- Species: †A. violacea

Binomial name
- †Amazona violacea (Gmelin, 1789)
- Location of Guadeloupe

Synonyms
- List: Psittacus violaceus Gmelin, 1788; Chrysotis violaceus (Rothschild, 1905); Amazona violaceas (Rothschild, 1905); Amazona violaceus (Rothschild, 1907); Anodorhynchus purpurascens (Rothschild, 1907)

= Guadeloupe amazon =

Hypothetical extinct species of parrot from the Caribbean

The Guadeloupe amazon or Guadeloupe parrot (Amazona violacea) is a hypothetical extinct species of parrot that is thought to have been endemic to the Lesser Antillean island region of Guadeloupe. Mentioned and described by 17th- and 18th-century writers, it received a scientific name in 1789. It was moved to the genus Amazona in 1905, and is thought to have been related to, or possibly the same as, the extant imperial amazon. A tibiotarsus (a lower leg bone) and an ulna (a lower arm bone) from the island of Marie-Galante may belong to the Guadeloupe amazon. In 1905, a species of extinct violet macaw was also claimed to have lived on Guadeloupe, but in 2015, it was suggested to have been based on a description of the Guadeloupe amazon.

According to contemporary descriptions, the head, neck and underparts of the Guadeloupe amazon were mainly violet or slate, mixed with green and black; the back was brownish green; and the wings were green, yellow and red. It had iridescent feathers, and was able to raise a "ruff" of feathers around its neck. The bird fed on fruits and nuts, and the male and female took turns sitting on the nest. It was eaten by French settlers, who also destroyed its habitat. Rare by 1779, it appears to have become extinct by the end of the 18th century.

== Taxonomy ==
The Guadeloupe amazon was first described in 1664 by the French botanist Jean-Baptiste Du Tertre, who also wrote about and illustrated the bird in 1667. The French clergyman Jean-Baptiste Labat described the bird in 1742, and it was mentioned in later natural history works by writers such as Mathurin Jacques Brisson, Comte de Buffon, and John Latham; the latter gave it the name "ruff-necked parrot". The German naturalist Johann Friedrich Gmelin coined the scientific name Psittacus violaceus for the bird in his 1789 edition of Systema Naturae, based on the writings of Du Tertre, Brisson, and Buffon. The specific name violaceus means "violet".

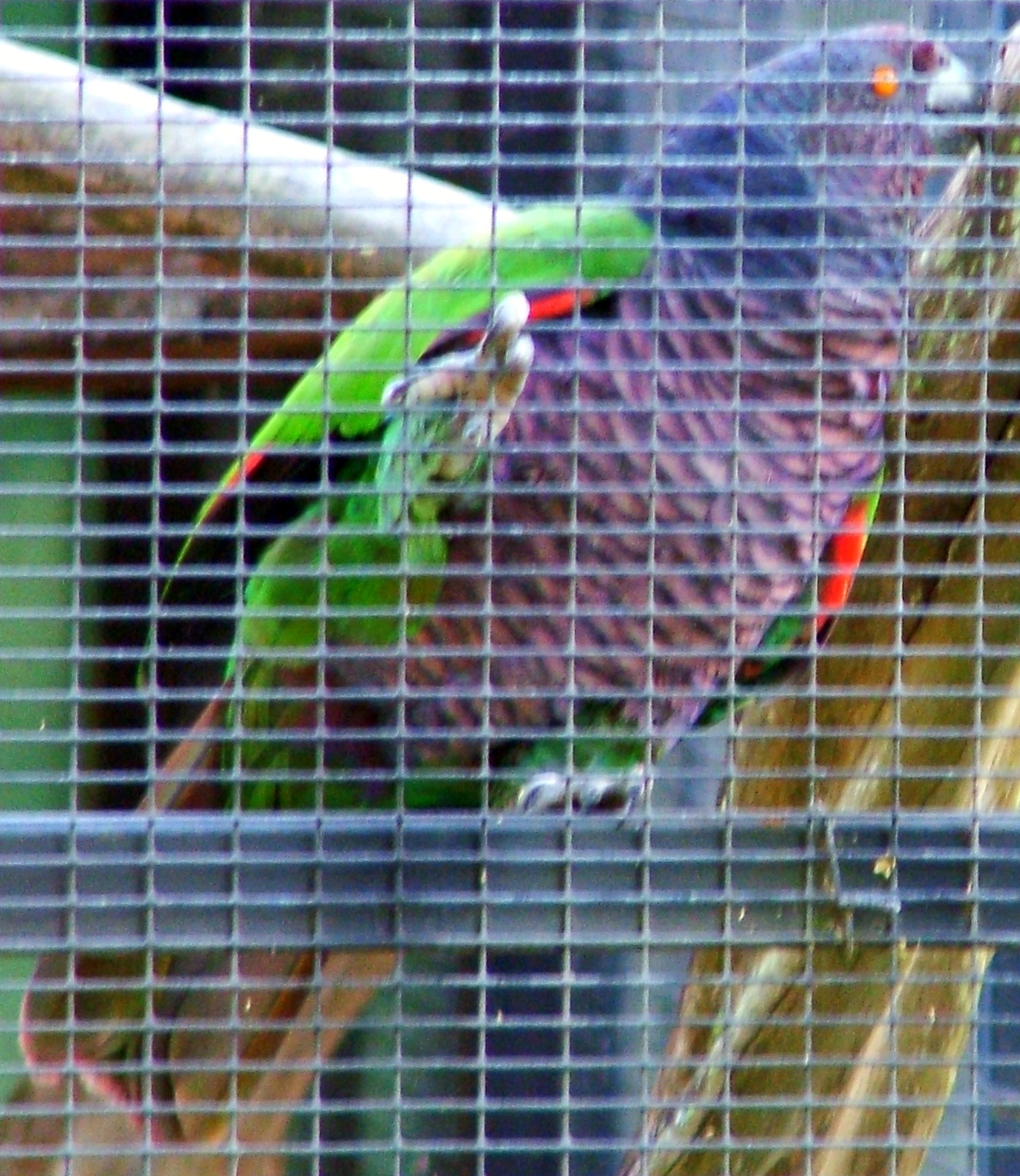
The imperial amazon of Dominica is possibly related or may be the same species.

In 1891, the Italian zoologist Tommaso Salvadori included Psittacus violaceus in a list of synonyms of the red-fan parrot (Deroptyus accipitrinus), a South American species. In 1905, the American zoologist Austin Hobart Clark pointed out that the colouration of the two species was dissimilar (their main similarity being a frill on the neck), and that Buffon stated that the parrot of Guadeloupe was not found in Cayenne where the red-fan parrot lives. Clark instead suggested that the Guadeloupe species was most closely related to the extant, similarly coloured imperial amazon (Amazona imperialis) of Dominica. He therefore placed the Guadeloupe bird in the same genus, with the new combination Amazona violacea, and referred to it by the common name "Guadeloupe parrot". The name Amazona comes from the French word "Amazone", which Buffon had used to refer to parrots from the Amazonian rainforest. In 1967, the American ornithologist James Greenway suggested that the amazon of Guadeloupe may have formed a superspecies with the imperial amazon and the extinct Martinique amazon (Amazona martinicana), and was perhaps a subspecies of the former. He considered it a hypothetical extinct species since it was only known from old accounts. The American ornithologist Storrs L. Olson considered the supposed amazons of Guadeloupe and Martinique valid in 1978, since species of the genus inhabit other islands in the region.

In 2001, the American ornithologists Matthew Williams and David Steadman argued in favor of the idea that the early accounts were a solid basis for the Guadeloupe amazon's existence. They also reported a tibiotarsus (a lower leg bone) found on the Folle Anse archaeological site on Marie-Galante, an island in the Guadeloupe region, which they found similar to that of the imperial amazon, but slightly shorter. Since Marie-Galante shares many modern bird species with Guadeloupe, they suggested that the bone belonged to the Guadeloupe amazon, and assigned it to A. cf. violacea (which implies the classification is uncertain). In 2004, the American biologist Patricia Ottens-Wainright and colleagues pointed out that the early descriptions of the Guadeloupe amazon did not clearly determine whether it was a unique species or the same species as the imperial amazon. Olson and the Puerto Rican ornithologist Edgar J. Maíz López stated in 2008 that the Guadeloupe amazon was probably the same as the imperial amazon. In contrast the English ornithologists Julian P. Hume and Michael Walters wrote in 2012 that though the amazon species of Guadeloupe and Martinique were based on accounts rather than physical remains, he found it likely they once existed, having been mentioned by trusted observers, and on zoogeographical grounds. In 2015, the ecologists Monica Gala and Arnaud Lenoble stated that an ulna (a lower arm bone) from Marie-Galante, which had been assigned to the extinct Lesser Antillean macaw (Ara guadeloupensis) by Williams and Steadman in 2001 and to the imperial amazon by Olson and Maiz in 2008, instead belonged to the Guadeloupe amazon.

=== The "violet macaw" ===
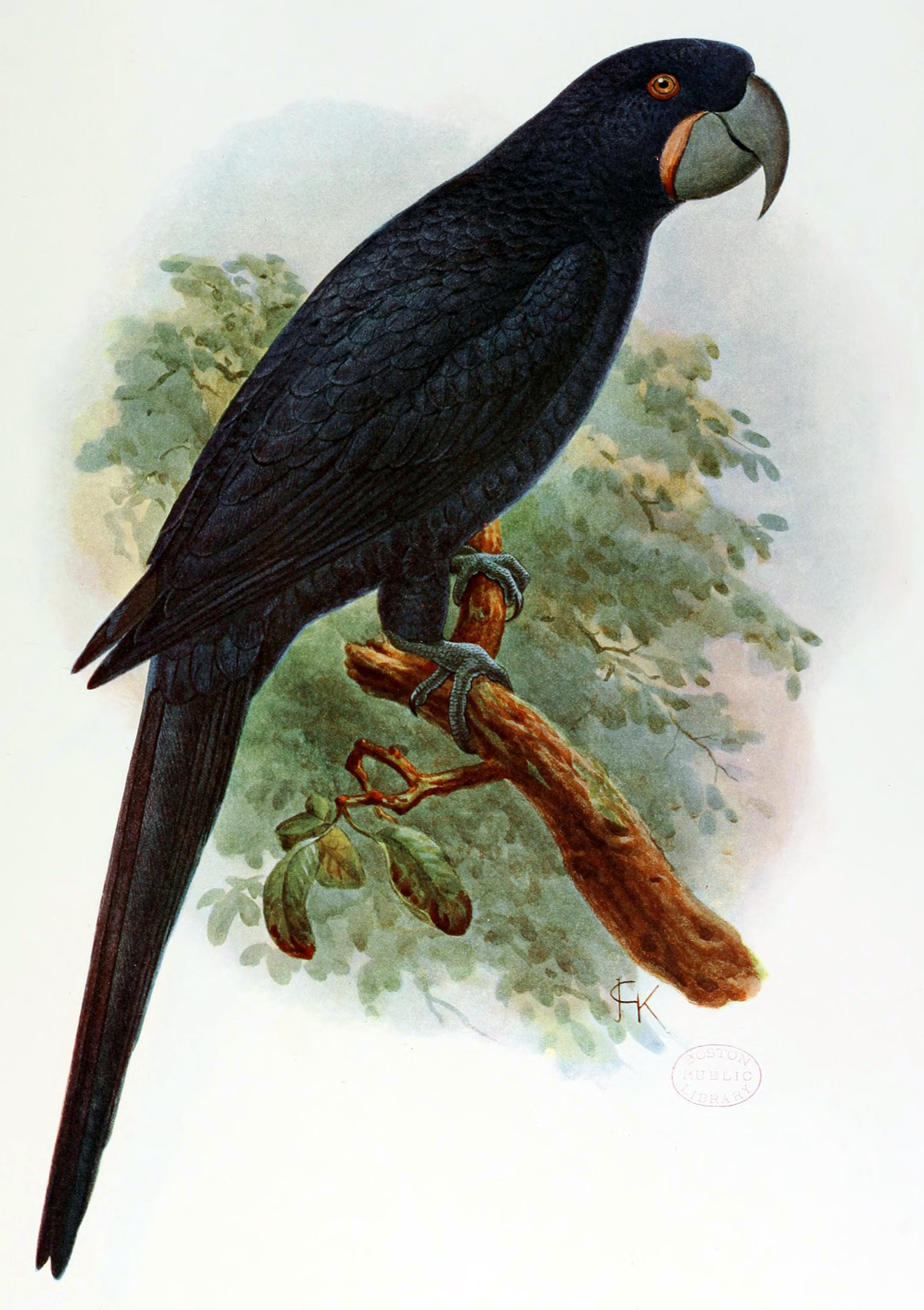
1907 illustration of the "violet macaw" by Keulemans

In 1905, the British zoologist Walter Rothschild named Anodorhynchus purpurascens, based on an old description of a deep violet parrot seen on Guadeloupe, found in an 1838 publication by a "Don de Navaret". He interpreted it as an extinct Anodorhynchus macaw due to its entirely blue colouration, and said the native Caribs called it "onécouli". Greenway suggested this "mythical macaw" may have been based on a careless description of the Guadeloupe amazon, or possibly an imported Lear's macaw (Anodorhynchus leari) from South America. He was unable to check the reference given by Rothschild, but suggested it may have been a publication by the Spanish historian Martín Fernández de Navarrete.

In 2000, the English writer Errol Fuller suggested the bird may have been an imported hyacinth macaw (Anodorhynchus hyacinthinus). In 2001, Williams and Steadman were also unable to find the reference listed by Rothschild, and concluded that the supposed species required further corroboration. The biologists James W. Wiley and Guy M. Kirwan were also unable to find the reference to the violet macaw in 2013, but pointed out an account by the Italian historian Peter Martyr d'Anghiera, who described how the Spanish took parrots that were mainly purple from Guadeloupe during the second voyage of Christopher Columbus.

In 2015, Lenoble reviewed overlooked historical Spanish and French texts, and identified the sources on which Rothschild had based the violet macaw. An 1828 publication by de Navarrete mentioned parrots on Guadeloupe during the second voyage of Columbus, but did not state their colour or include the term "onécouli". Lenoble instead pointed to a Carib-French dictionary by the French missionary Raymond Breton (who was on Guadeloupe from 1635 to 1654) which included terms for parrots, and the passage "onicoali is the Guadeloupe variety, which differs from the others being larger and violet, with red-lined wings". Lenoble concluded that this referred to the Guadeloupe amazon since Breton appears to have reserved the word parrot for birds smaller than macaws, and due to the consistent plumage pattern mentioned. Lenoble recognised all the elements of Rothschild's description in Breton's text, but suggested that Rothschild must have relied on a secondary source since he spelled the name differently. This source appears to have been a footnote in an 1866 article, which quoted Breton, but gave an incorrect citation. It used a francised version of the bird's name ("onécouli"), and implied it could have been a macaw. Lenoble therefore concluded that the supposed "violet macaw" was based on misidentified references to the Guadeloupe amazon, and that the Lesser Antillean macaw was the only macaw species that lived on Guadeloupe. Hume agreed with Lenoble's conclusion in 2017.

== Description ==
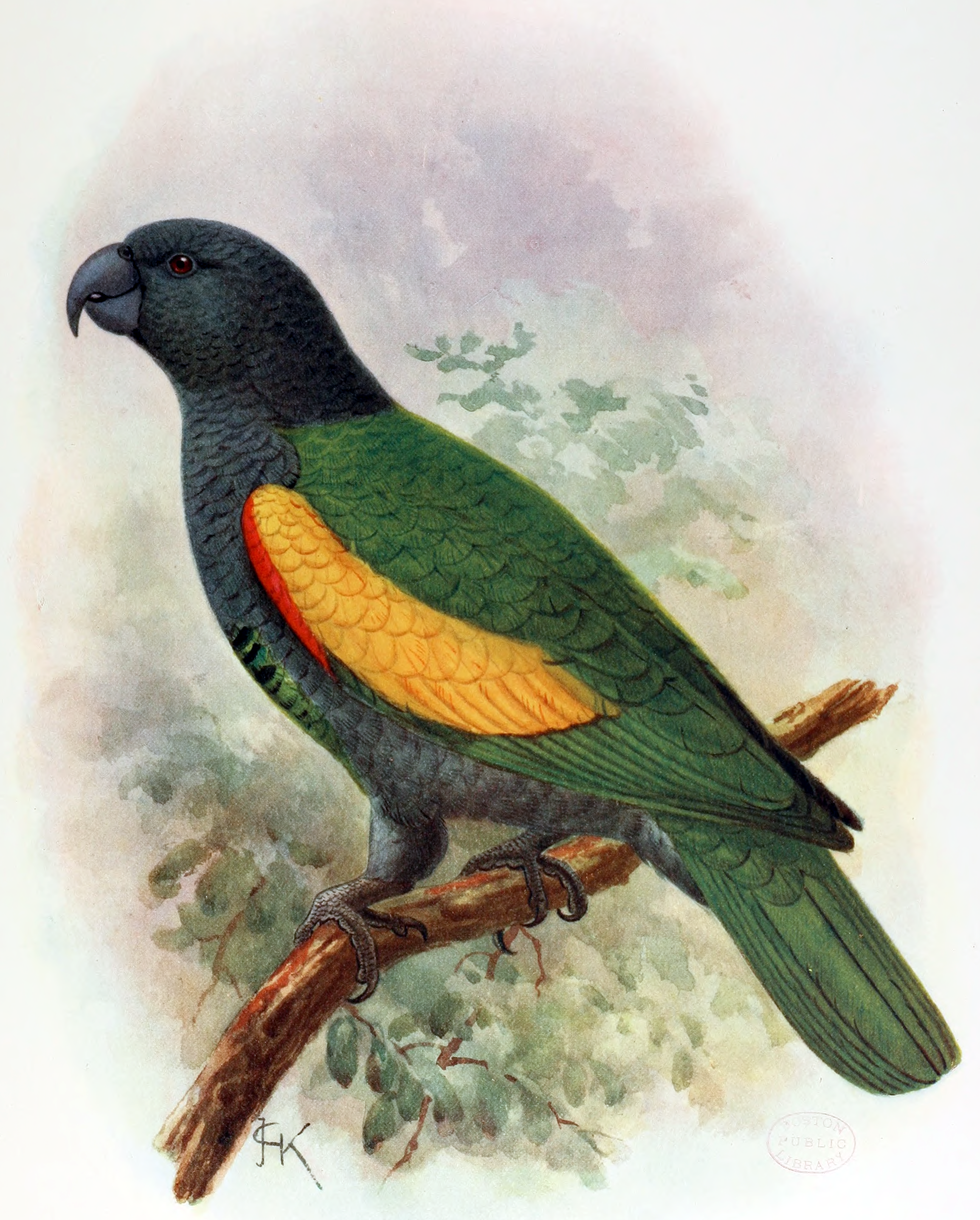
Hypothetical illustration of the Guadeloupe amazon by Keulemans, 1907

Du Tertre described the Guadeloupe amazon as follows in 1654:

The Parrot of Guadeloupe is almost as large as a fowl. The beak and the eye are bordered with carnation. All the feathers of the head, neck, and underparts are of a violet color, mixed with a little green and black, and changeable like the throat of a pigeon. All the upper part of the back is brownish green. The long quills are black, the others yellow, green, and red, and it has on the wing-coverts two rosettes of rose color.

Labat described the bird as follows in 1742:

The Parrots of these islands are distinguishable from those of the mainland of Guinea (? Guiana) by their different plumage; those of Guadeloupe are a little smaller than the Macaws. The head, neck, and underparts are slaty, with a few green and black feathers; the back is wholly green, the wings green, yellow, and red.

Clark noted that the iridescent feathers described are not unique to the Guadeloupe amazon, as other freshly killed amazons also show this to a greater or lesser degree, especially the Saint Vincent amazon (Amazona guildingii). He suggested that the black of the head and underparts of the Guadeloupe bird could have been the borders of the feathers, as seen in the imperial amazon, whereas the green may have been a sign of immaturity, like in the Saint Vincent amazon. He also likened the brownish green upperparts to those of a young Saint Vincent amazon, and suggested that the red "rosettes" mentioned by Du Tertre may have been scattered feathers in the wing covert feathers. Clark listed features of the imperial amazon which contrasted with those of the Guadeloupe amazon, such as its deep purple head and underparts, green upperparts, wings with dark brown, purple, green, blue and red feathers.

As well as being described as violet by Du Tertre and slate by Labat, the head and underparts of the bird were described as ashy blue by Brisson. Greenway suggested some of this discrepancy may have been because Labat confused the Guadeloupe amazon with the Martinique amazon, as he appears not to have distinguished between the birds. Hume consolidated these descriptions under the term "slaty-blue".

Rothschild featured an illustration of the Guadeloupe amazon in his 1907 book Extinct Birds by the Dutch artist John Gerrard Keulemans, based on the early descriptions. In 1916, the American ornithologist Robert Ridgway criticised the illustration for differing from Du Tertre's description; Du Tertre supposedly only meant that the proximal primary feathers were yellow, whereas all the covert feathers are yellow in the illustration, apart from a red edge, and the head and underparts are slate.

== Behaviour and ecology ==
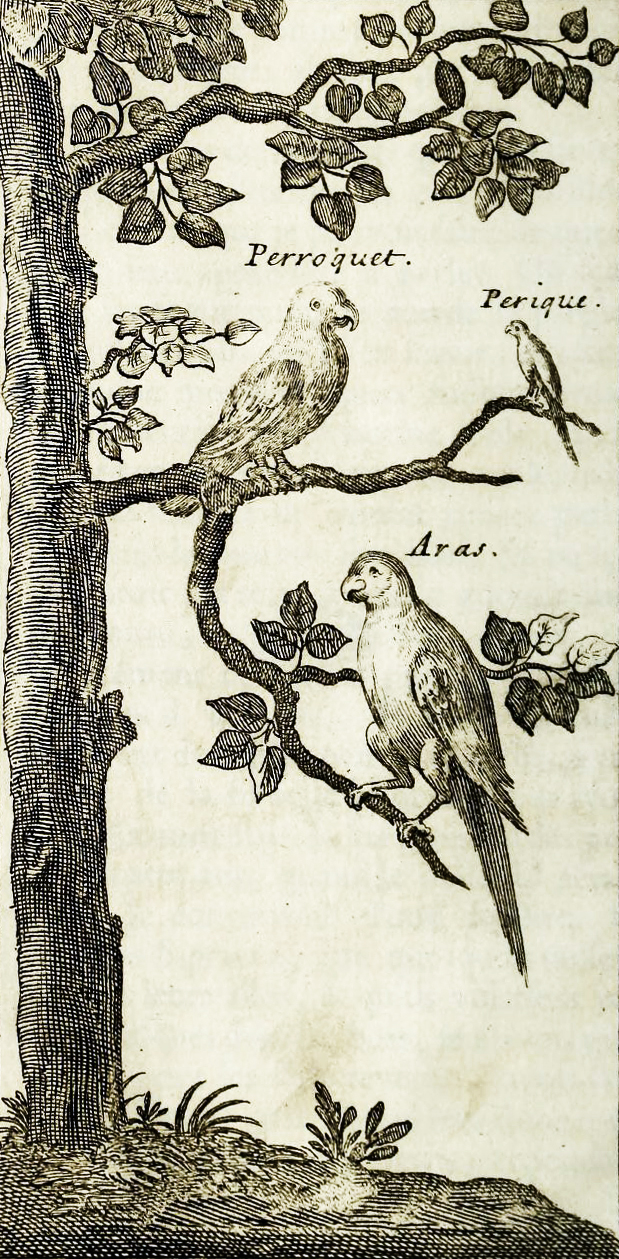
Labat's 1722 illustration of a Guadeloupe amazon and Guadeloupe parakeet above, and a Lesser Antillean macaw

In 1664 Du Tertre described some behavioural traits of the Guadeloupe amazon, and listed items among its diet:

When it erects the feathers of its neck, it makes a beautiful ruff about its head, which it seems to admire, as a peacock its tail. It has a strong voice, talks very distinctly, and learns quickly if taken young. It lives on the wild fruits which grow in the forests, except that it does not eat the manchioneel. Cotton seed intoxicates it, and affects it as wine does a man; and for that reason they eat it with great eagerness ... The flavor of its flesh is excellent, but changeable, according to the kind of food. If it eats cashew nuts, the flesh has an agreeable flavor of garlic; if 'bois des inde' it has a flavor of cloves and cinnamon; if on bitter fruits, it becomes bitter like gall. If it feeds on genips, the flesh becomes wholly black, but that does not prevent its having a very fine flavor. When it feeds on guavas it is at its best, and then the French commit great havoc among them.

Clark noted that the Saint Vincent amazon and other amazon species can also raise a "ruff" of feathers around their neck when excited.

In 1667, Du Tertre repeated his description of the Guadeloupe amazon, and added some details about its breeding behaviour:

We had two which built their nest a hundred paces from our house in a large tree. The male and the female sat alternately, and came one after the other to feed at the house, where they brought their young when they were large enough to leave the nest.

== Extinction ==
In 1779, Buffon stated that the Guadeloupe amazon had become very rare, and indicated why it may have become extinct:

We have never seen this parrot, and it is not found in Cayenne. It is even very rare in Guadeloupe today, for none of the inhabitants of that island have given us any information concerning it; but that is not extraordinary, for since the islands have been inhabited, the number of parrots has greatly diminished, and Dutertre remarks in particular of this one that the French colonists wage a terrible war on it in the season when it is especially fat and succulent.

Greenway suggested that both the French settlers and their slaves ate the Guadeloupe amazon as well as destroyed its habitat. The supposedly related imperial amazon survives in the steep mountain forests of Dominica. Guadeloupe is less mountainous than Dominica, more suitable for farming and, historically, has had a larger human population. Because of this, there would have been a greater pressure on the Guadeloupe amazon and it appears to have become extinct by the end of the 18th century. All the amazon species still extant on the West Indian islands are endangered, since they are trapped for the pet-trade and overhunted for food, and also because of destruction of their habitat.
