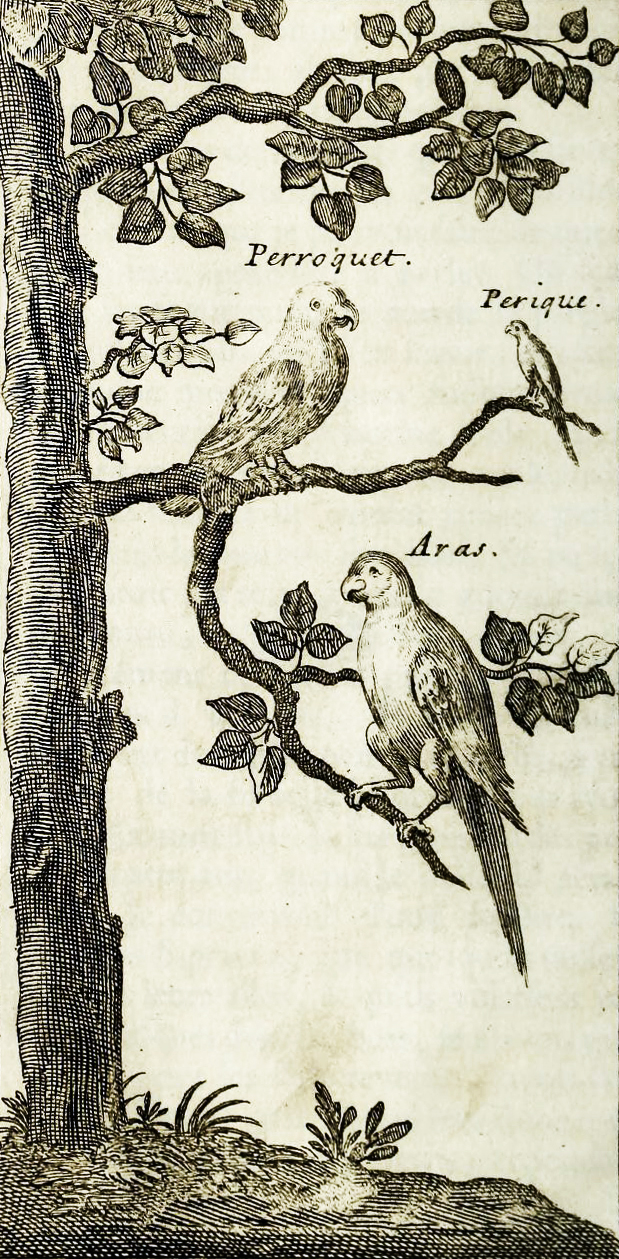
- Jean-Baptiste Labat's 1722 illustration of a Guadeloupe parakeet at the top right, with a Guadeloupe amazon to its left and a Lesser Antillean macaw below

Conservation status
- Extinct (IUCN 3.1)

Scientific classification (disputed)
- Kingdom: Animalia
- Phylum: Chordata
- Class: Aves
- Order: Psittaciformes
- Family: Psittacidae
- Genus: Psittacara
- Species: †P. labati

Binomial name
- †Psittacara labati (Rothschild, 1905)
- Location of the Guadeloupe region

= Guadeloupe parakeet =

Extinct species of bird

The Guadeloupe parakeet (Psittacara labati) is a hypothetical extinct species of parrot that is thought to have been endemic to the Lesser Antillean island region of Guadeloupe.

== Taxonomy ==
They were later named Conurus labati, and are now called the Guadeloupe parakeet. It has been postulated to be a separate species based on little evidence. There are no specimens or remains of the extinct parrots. Their taxonomy may never be fully elucidated, and so their postulated status as a separate species is hypothetical. It is presumed to have gone extinct in the late 18th century, if it did indeed exist.

== Description ==
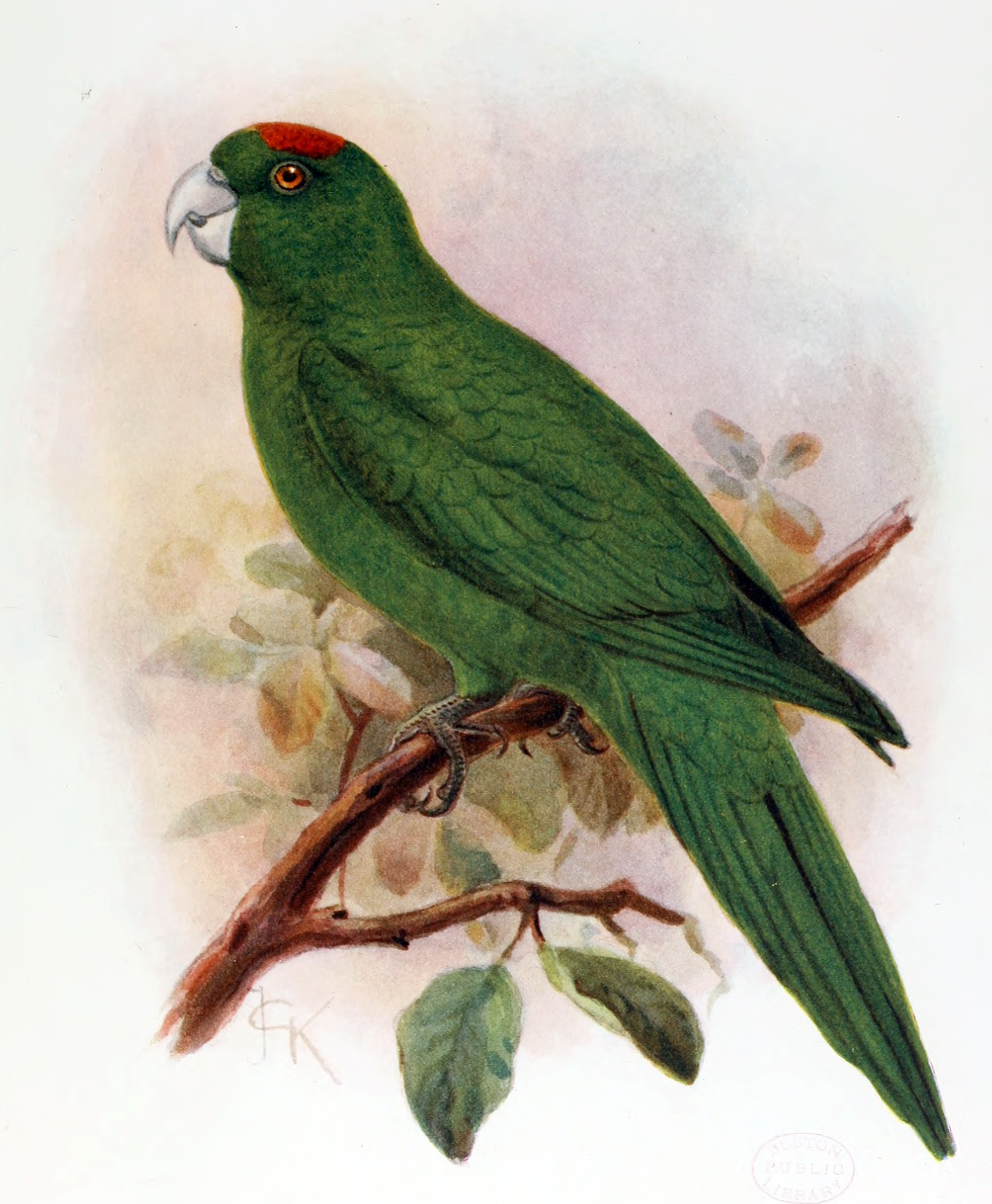
Hypothetical life restoration by John Gerrard Keulemans, 1907

Jean-Baptiste Labat described a population of small parrots living on Guadeloupe:

Those of Guadaloupe are about the size of a blackbird, entirely green, except a few small red feathers, which they have on their head. Their bill is white. They are very gentle, loving, and learn to speak easily.
