= Dominican green-and-yellow macaw =

Conservation status
- Extinct (IUCN 3.1)

- Data Deficient (IUCN 3.1)

Scientific classification (disputed)
- Kingdom: Animalia
- Phylum: Chordata
- Class: Aves
- Order: Psittaciformes
- Family: Psittacidae
- Genus: Ara
- Species: †A. atwoodi

Binomial name
- †Ara atwoodi Clark, 1908
- Location of Dominica

Synonyms
- Amazona atwoodi (lapsus)

Extinct species of bird

The Dominican green-and-yellow macaw (Ara atwoodi), Atwood's macaw or Dominican macaw, is a hypothetical species of macaw that may have lived on the island of Dominica. It is known only through the writings of British colonial judge Thomas Atwood in his 1791 book, The History of the Island of Dominica:

The macaw is of the parrot kind, but larger than the common parrot, and makes a more disagreeable, harsh noise. They are in great plenty, as are also parrots in this island; have both of them a delightful green and yellow plumage, with a scarlet-colored fleshy substance from the ears to the root of the bill, of which color is likewise the chief feathers of their wings and tails. They breed on the tops of the highest trees, where they feed on the berries in great numbers together; and are easily discovered by their loud chattering noise, which at a distance resembles human voices. The macaws cannot be taught to articulate words; but the parrots of this country may, by taking pains with them when caught young. The flesh of both is eat, but being very very fat, it wastes in roasting, and eats dry and insipid; for which reason, they are chiefly used to make soup of, which is accounted very nutritive.

Austin Hobart Clark initially included these macaws in Ara guadeloupensis in 1905, but upon being referred to Atwood's writings, he listed them as a distinct species in 1908. As no archeological remains are known, it is widely considered a hypothetical extinct species. Atwood described a bird which was commonly captured for food and pets.

The Dominican macaw probably became extinct in the late 18th or early 19th century.
