= Austin Hobart Clark =

American zoologist (1880–1954)

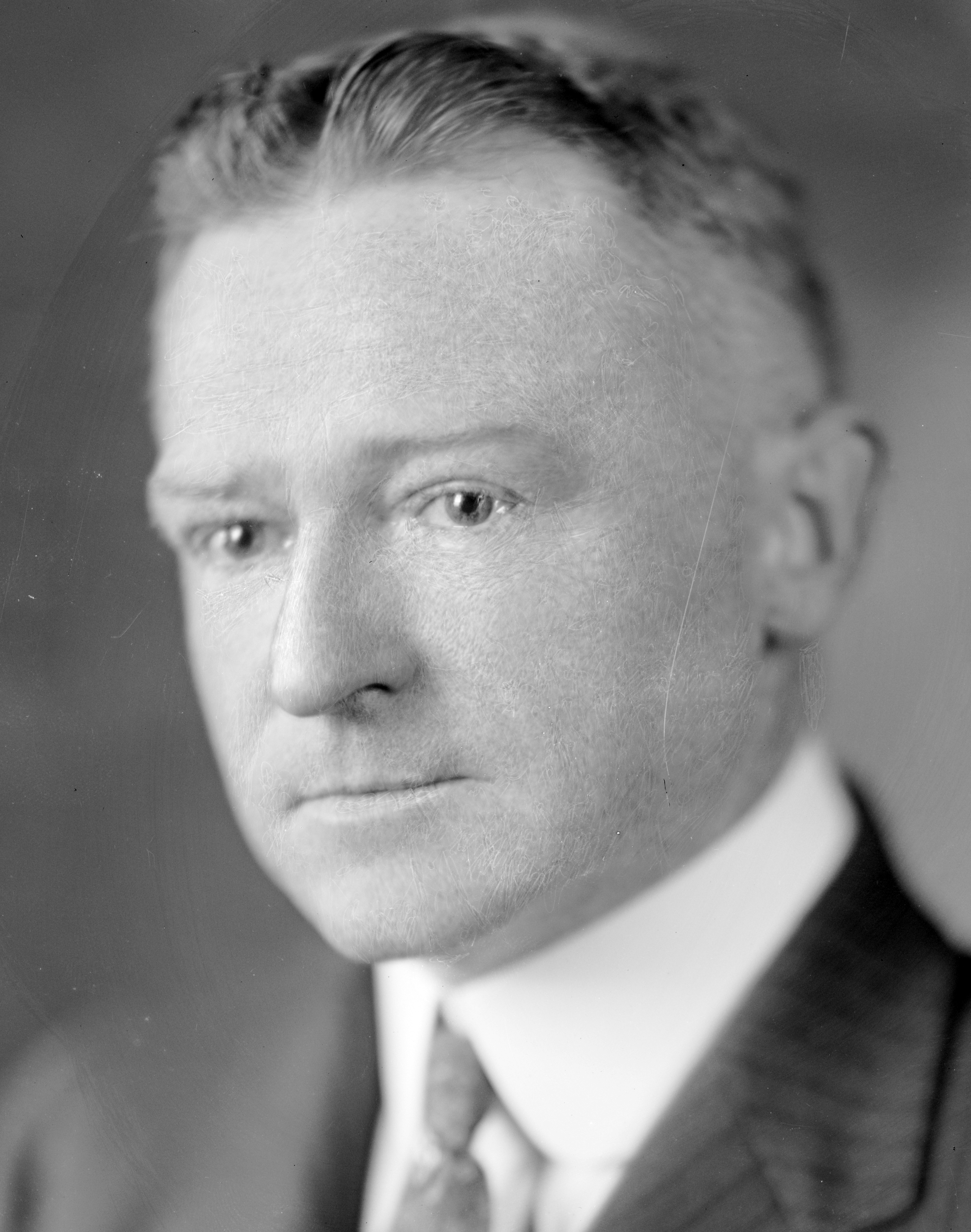
Austin Hobart Clark

Austin Hobart Clark (December 17, 1880 in Wellesley, Massachusetts – October 28, 1954 in Washington, D.C.) was an American zoologist who studied oceanography, marine biology, ornithology and entomology.

== Personal life ==
The son of Theodore Minot Clark and Jeannette French Clark, Clark obtained his Bachelor of Arts at Harvard University in 1903. He had five children with his first wife Mary Wendell Upham, whom he married on March 6, 1906. Mary died in December 1931 and he married Leila Gay Forbes in 1933.

== Career ==
In 1901, Clark organized a scientific expedition to Isla Margarita in Venezuela. From 1903 to 1905, he conducted research in the Antilles. From 1906 to 1907, he led a scientific team aboard the 1882 USS Albatross. In 1908, he took a post at the National Museum of Natural History, which he held until his retirement in 1950.

Clark had important and various roles in a number of learned societies: he was president of the Entomological Society of Washington, vice president of the American Geophysical Union, and directed the press service of the American Association for the Advancement of Science.

Clark wrote more than 600 publications written in English, French, Italian, German, and Russian. Some of the most well-known include Animals of Land and Sea (1925), Nature Narratives (two volumes, 1929 and 1931), The New Evolution (1930), and Animals Alive (1948).

Several animal species and genera were first scientifically described by Clark, including the Lesser Antillean macaw (1905), the Martinique parrot (1905), the Dominican green-and-yellow macaw (1908), the mulga parrot (1910), the crustacean genus Laomenes (1919) or the starfish species Copidaster lymani (1948).

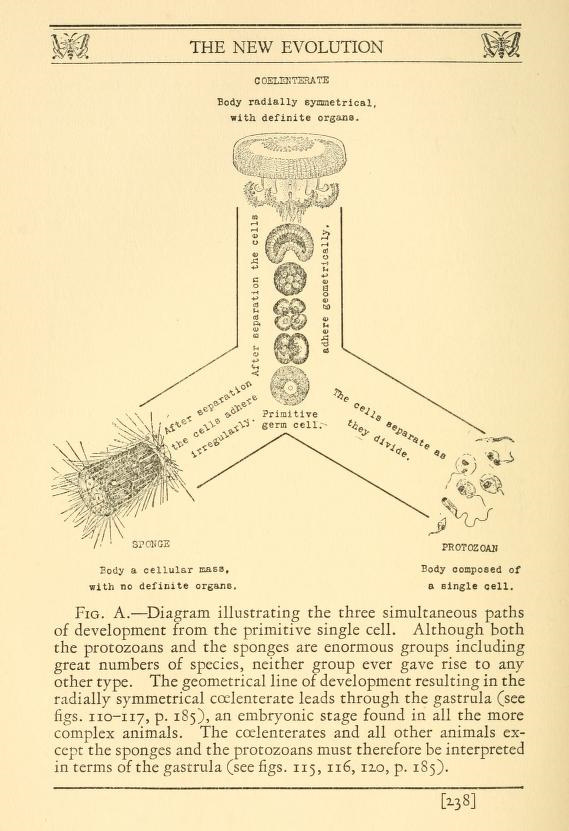
"Three sumultaneous paths of development from the primitive single cell", Zoogenesis

== Zoogenesis ==
Clark is best known for his evolutionary theory called zoogenesis, which he introduced in his book The New Evolution: Zoogenesis (1930). His theory challenged the single tree view of evolution, according to Clark the major types of life forms on Earth evolved separately and independently from all the others. Clark wrote that "the seemingly simultaneous appearance of all the phyla or major groups of animals simply means that life at its very first beginnings developed at once and simultaneously from the primitive single cell in every possible direction, giving rise to some original form or forms in every phylum." He termed this process, eogenesis.

Clark was quote-mined by creationists but he rejected any supernatural view of origins.

== Selected publications ==
- Animals of Land and Sea (1925)
- Nature Narratives (1929-1931)
- The New Evolution: Zoogenesis (1930)
- Zoogenesis: The New Theory of Evolution (Scientific American, 1930)
- Eogenesis: The Origin of Animal Forms (1937)
