= Thomas Atwood (judge) =

Judge (died 1793)

Chief Justice of the Bahamas
- In office 1774–1785
- Succeeded by: John Matson

Chief Justice of Dominica
- In office 1766–1773
- Succeeded by: James Ashley Hall

Personal details
- Died: 27 May 1793

Thomas Atwood (died 1793) was chief justice of the island of Dominica, and afterwards of the Bahamas.

== Biography ==
Although there are no records of the biographical details of Atwood's life, he wrote the first complete account of Dominica from both a historical and general perspective, The History of the Island of Dominica. In it he explained his belief that Dominica was able to be the best colony that the English held in the West Indies, due to its high proportion of fertile and uncultivated land.

From a historical perspective, he explained that the island had flourished due to the free port of Roseau between 1770 and 1775, however due to mismanagement and "disadvantages" under the French rule after invasion of Dominica in 1778 until their surrender in 1783. However, he expressed his opinion that the island could be turned around with additional cattle and an increase of enslaved Africans for the sugar plantations. The history was published in 1791, and he also published a pamphlet - Observations on the true method of treatment and usage of the Negro slaves in the British West India Islands in which he defended slavery, claiming that the slaves were treated better than English workers back home.

Atwood's description of Dominica during the American Revolution was directly incorporated by Bryan Edwards into his 1793 The History, Civil and Commercial, of the British Colonies in the West Indies.

Atwood died in the King's Bench prison "at an advanced age, broken down with misfortunes, on 27 May 1793."

== Legacy ==
The extinct Dominican green-and-yellow macaw is named Ara atwoodi in honour of his description of it in his 1791 The History of the Island of Dominica.

== Works ==
- Atwood, Thomas (1791). The History of the Island of Dominica. London, England: J. Johnson – via Internet Archive.
- Atwood, Thomas (1789). Observations on the True Methods of Treatment & Usage of the Negro Slaves in the British West-India Islands. London, England: John Mott – via ECCO.
