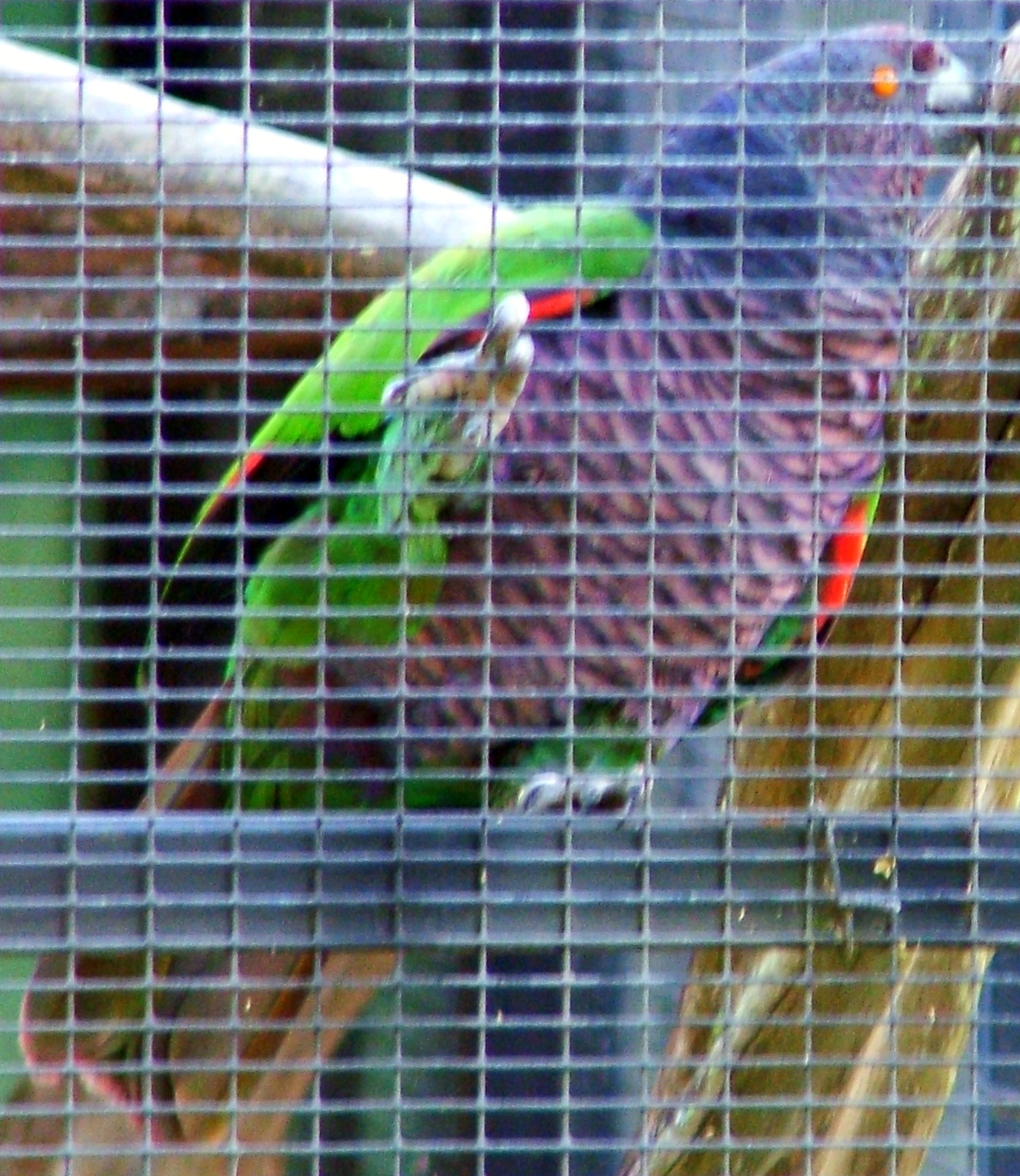
- At the Parrot Conservation and Research Centre, Roseau, Dominica

Conservation status
- Critically Endangered (IUCN 3.1)
- CITES Appendix I

Scientific classification
- Kingdom: Animalia
- Phylum: Chordata
- Class: Aves
- Order: Psittaciformes
- Family: Psittacidae
- Genus: Amazona
- Species: A. imperialis

Binomial name
- Amazona imperialis Richmond, 1899

= Imperial amazon =

Species of rare bird in the Caribbean

The imperial amazon (Amazona imperialis) or Dominican amazon, also known as the sisserou or sisserou parrot, is a parrot found only on the Caribbean island of Dominica. It has been designated as the national bird of Dominica, and features on the national flag of Dominica. The species is critically endangered. In 2019, it was estimated there were only about 50 mature individuals left in the wild.

== Description ==
The imperial amazon measures an average of 48 cm (19 in) in length. With males weighing an average of 900 g (32 oz) and females 650 g (23 oz), the species is large for its genus.

Being of the family Psittacidae, the sisserou has zygodactyl feet and a thick, hooked bill with a muscular tongue. This bill is fashioned in such a way that, using its hinged mandibles and tongue, the sisserou can easily move food around in its mouth.

Males and females have identical plumage: the chest is a dark shade of purple, and the upper parts and feathers are a dark shade of green, with black-edged feather tips. The eye-ring is dark brown, with the eye being a mix of orange and red. Juvenile appearance does not differ much, with a higher occurrence of green plumage and strictly brown eyes.

== Behavior ==
The call of the sisserou resides in the higher frequencies, a loud and even "squeaky" mix between shriek, squawk, and trill. They are shy, difficult to approach, and usually travel in groups of three or fewer. They sometimes flock together with red-necked amazons. They are good climbers and strong flyers with powerful wings. They prefer to perch on the tops of trees. They are difficult to detect, as they are well camouflaged by their plumage.

=== Breeding ===
Between February and April, nesting occurs and the female will lay a clutch of two white eggs in a deep cavity inside a rainforest tree, returning to the same tree year after year. For 26–28 days, the female will incubate the eggs. During fledging, which occurs between June and early September, both parents will take care of and feed the chicks until they are fully feathered and ready to leave the nest. The chicks use typical "begging calls" when hungry, to which either parent will respond with food. Usually only one chick survives to fledging and, typically, sisserou pairs fledge a single chick every other year; however, there have been documented exceptions.

These parrots mate for life and are extremely faithful to each other. They might seek another mate only after a mate dies. However, the bird may grieve to death rather than find a new mate.

=== Feeding ===
The sisserou's diet consists of fruits, seeds, nuts, berries, blossoms and palm shoots. Their favorite foods include the fruits of Dacryodes species, Licania ternatensis, Richeria grandis, Amanoa carboea, Simarouba amara, Symphonia globulifera, Pouteria pollida, Tapuru atillan, the flowers and seeds of Chimarcis cymosa, and the nuts and young shoots of Euterpe palms. Usually, they feed in the morning and evening.

== Distribution and habitat ==
On the flag of Dominica

The imperial amazon is endemic to the Caribbean island nation of Dominica in the Lesser Antilles where it inhabits mountain forest areas above 2,100 ft (625 m). It is the island's national bird and also appears on the country's flag. The species frequently occurs in the Morne Diablotins in northern Dominica, especially the upper Picard River Valley on the northwest side of the mountain. A small population has been reintroduced in the Morne Trois Pitons National Park.

Imperial amazons are found primarily in mountain rainforest, sometimes in elfin forest. They occur mostly at elevations of 600–1300 m above sea level. However, there have been reports of them at 150 to 300 meters in elevation because of food storage or foraging preferences.

== Status and conservation ==
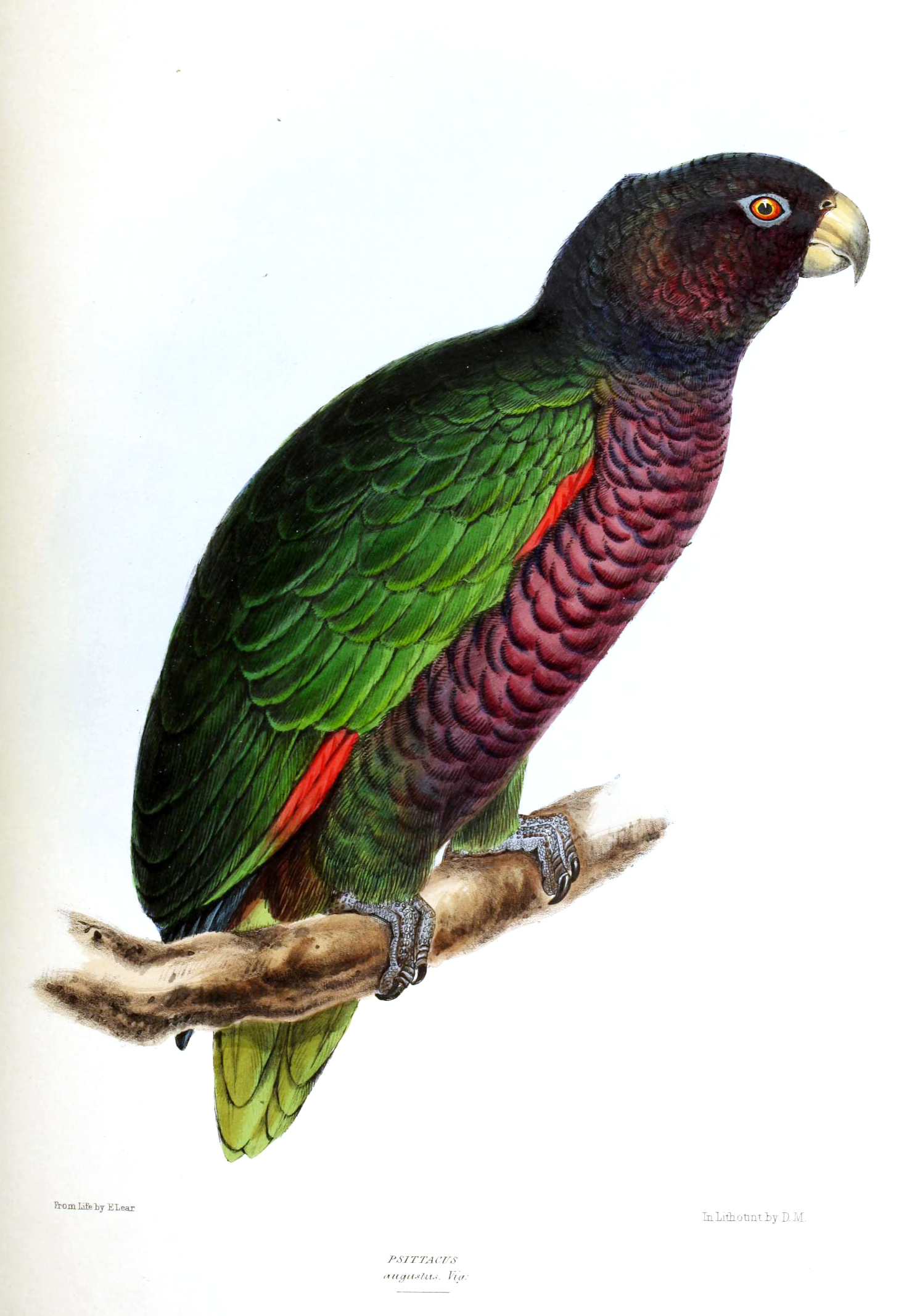
Illustration of the imperial amazon parrot by English zoologist David William Mitchell

The imperial amazon is a critically endangered species. There are estimated to be only about 50 mature individuals left in the wild as of 2019. There have been many efforts to help the habitat for these parrots. With the help of Dominica's Forestry, and the Wildlife and Parks Division and the Rare Species Conservatory Foundation (RSCF), areas such as the Northern Forest Reserve and the Central Forest Reserve are protected. However areas adjacent to the Northern Forest Reserve and the Central Forest Reserve remain unprotected. Efforts are being made to help make other areas of Dominica protected. Many of the organizations have helped create groups of people to raise awareness, provide education, and conduct research. The educational programs held in Dominica have reduced the bird trade. The first successful breeding of this species by humans was conducted in 2011. The captive-bred parrot developed fully in 12 weeks and resembled the wild imperial amazon parrots. No one really knew what the reproductive potential of these parrots was. The imperial amazon has the lowest reproductive potential of any of the Amazona species.

=== Threats ===
A major cause of population decline has been hurricanes. Hurricane David of August 1979 was one of the strongest that hit Dominica and impacted the population. Another hit was by Hurricane Maria in September 2017, which caused extensive damage on the island, affecting habitat.

Habitat loss is caused by human disturbance in the forest, with selective logging and the deforestation. Trapping for food and trade is still a threat, even though education programmes have reduced the local market greatly. Illegal animal trading is a big market, and these birds are hunted to be sold on the black market. In the 1900s there were efforts to ban all illegal bird captivity and trading, but foreign traders still try to hunt this bird; some are successful. The development of plantations has also reduced their habitat, especially the cultivation of bananas (Snyder et al. 2000). Encroachment of human development has been a big issue as well, and conservationists are trying save the birds' preferred habitat.

Nesting cavity competition with red-necked amazons and owls creates a tough living environment for imperial amazons. They mate only for a couple of months of the year, and guard their nests the rest of the year. A good quality nesting site is key to the survival and upbringing of their offspring.

Imperial amazons are preyed on by Dominican boas, broad-winged hawks, common opossums and rats.

=== Guadeloupe amazon ===
The hypothetical or extinct Guadeloupe amazon (A. violacea) may be the same bird as the imperial amazon, if not a close relative. Based on old descriptions alone, the information on the Guadeloupe amazon, pairs well with what is observed about the imperial amazon. A bone found on Marie-Galante (between Dominica and Guadeloupe) has been assigned to A. violacea and suggests that A. imperialis either inhabited, or was traded between, all three islands in prehistoric times.
