= Jean-Baptiste Du Tertre =

French blackfriar and botanist

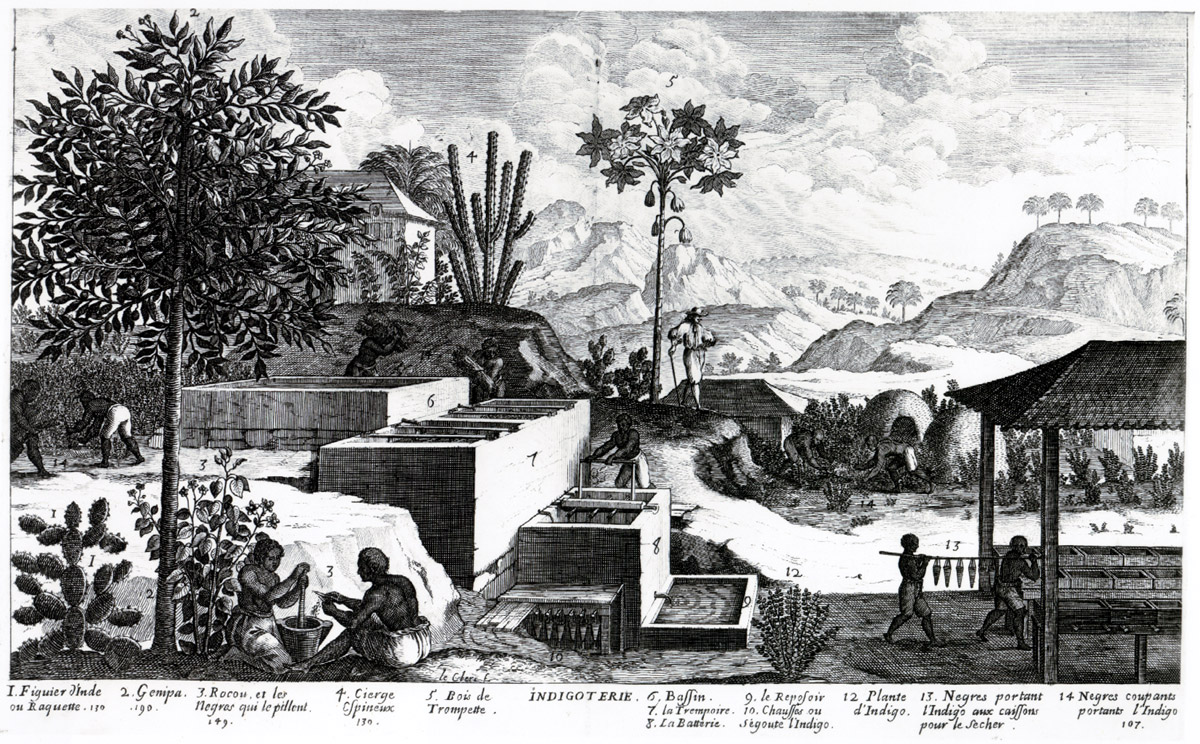
Engraving by Jean-Baptiste Du Tertre about an Indigoterie from his work l'Histoire générale des Antilles habitées par les Français from 1667

Jean-Baptiste Du Tertre (Jacques Du Tertre; 1610 in Calais – 1687 in Paris) was a French blackfriar and botanist.

In 1633 he joined the Dutch army where he worked in the headquarters in Maastricht. Subsequently, he joined the Dominican Order where he adapted his first name Jean-Baptiste.

In 1640 he was sent as missionary to the Antilles from where he returned to France in 1658.

He is the author of several works about the Antilles where he described the indigenous peoples, the animals, and the plant world, including Histoire générale des îles Saint-Christophe, de la Guadeloupe, de la Martinique et autres de l'Amérique (Paris, 1654), Histoire naturelle et morale des îles Antilles de l'Amérique avec un vocabulaire caraïbe (1658), La Vie de Sainte Austreberte (1659) and l'Histoire générale des Antilles habitées par les Français (four volumes, 1667–1671). Particularly in his last work Du Tertre created the myth of the "Bon Sauvage" where he placed "the virtuousness of the heathen Caribs above the immoral life of the Europeans".

Du Tertre was the first who described the yellow fever when several epidemics burst over Guadeloupe and Saint Christopher in 1635, 1640, 1648 and 1667.

== Bibliography (selected) ==
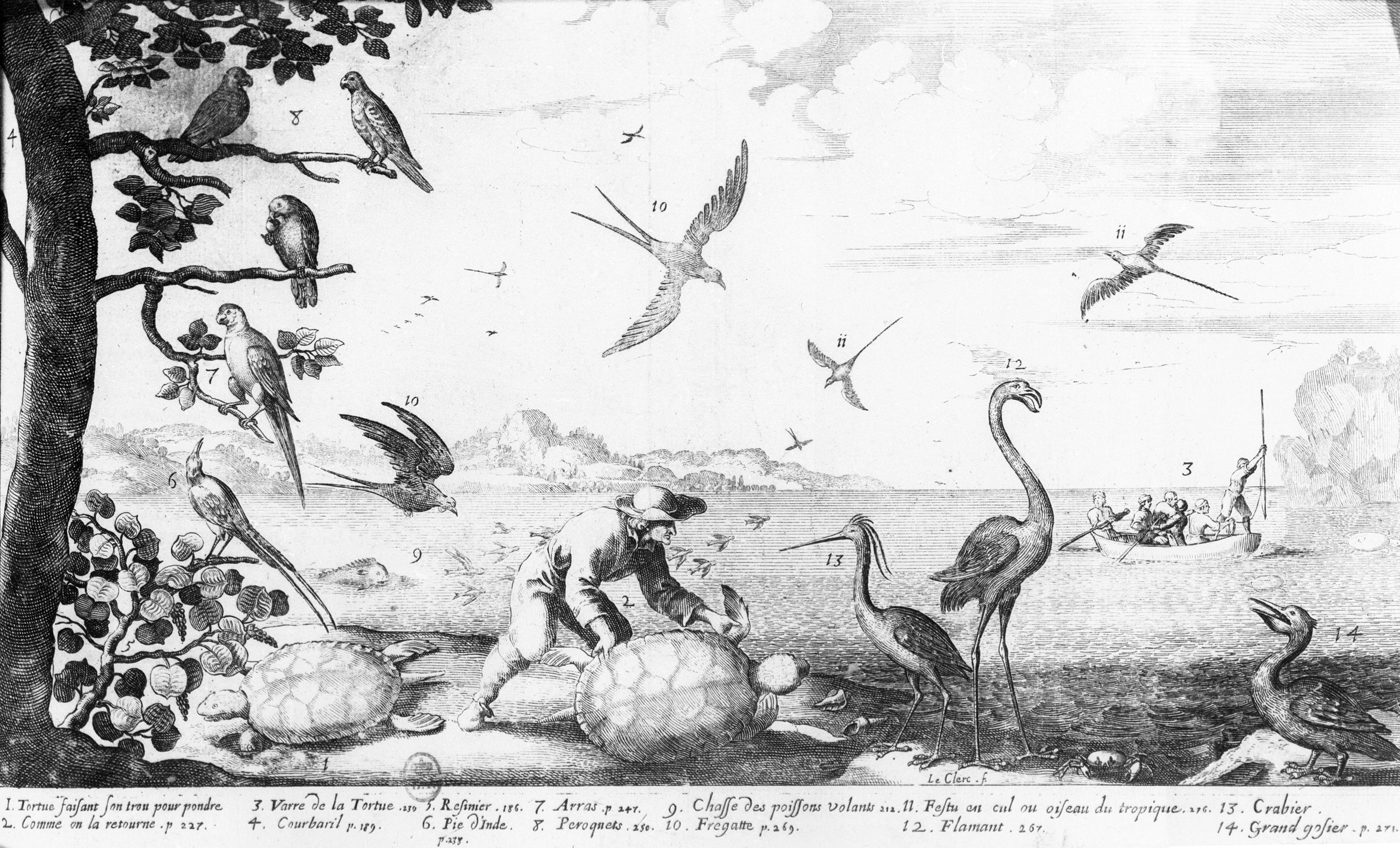
Du Tertre's illustration of various animals on Guadeloupe

- 1654: Histoire générale des îles Saint-Christophe, de la Guadeloupe, de la Martinique et autres de l'Amérique
- 1659: La Vie de Sainte Austreberte
- 1667–1671: Histoire générale des Antilles habitées par les François (4 volumes)
