= Jean-Baptiste Labat =

French clergyman, botanist, writer, explorer, ethnographer, soldier, and engineer

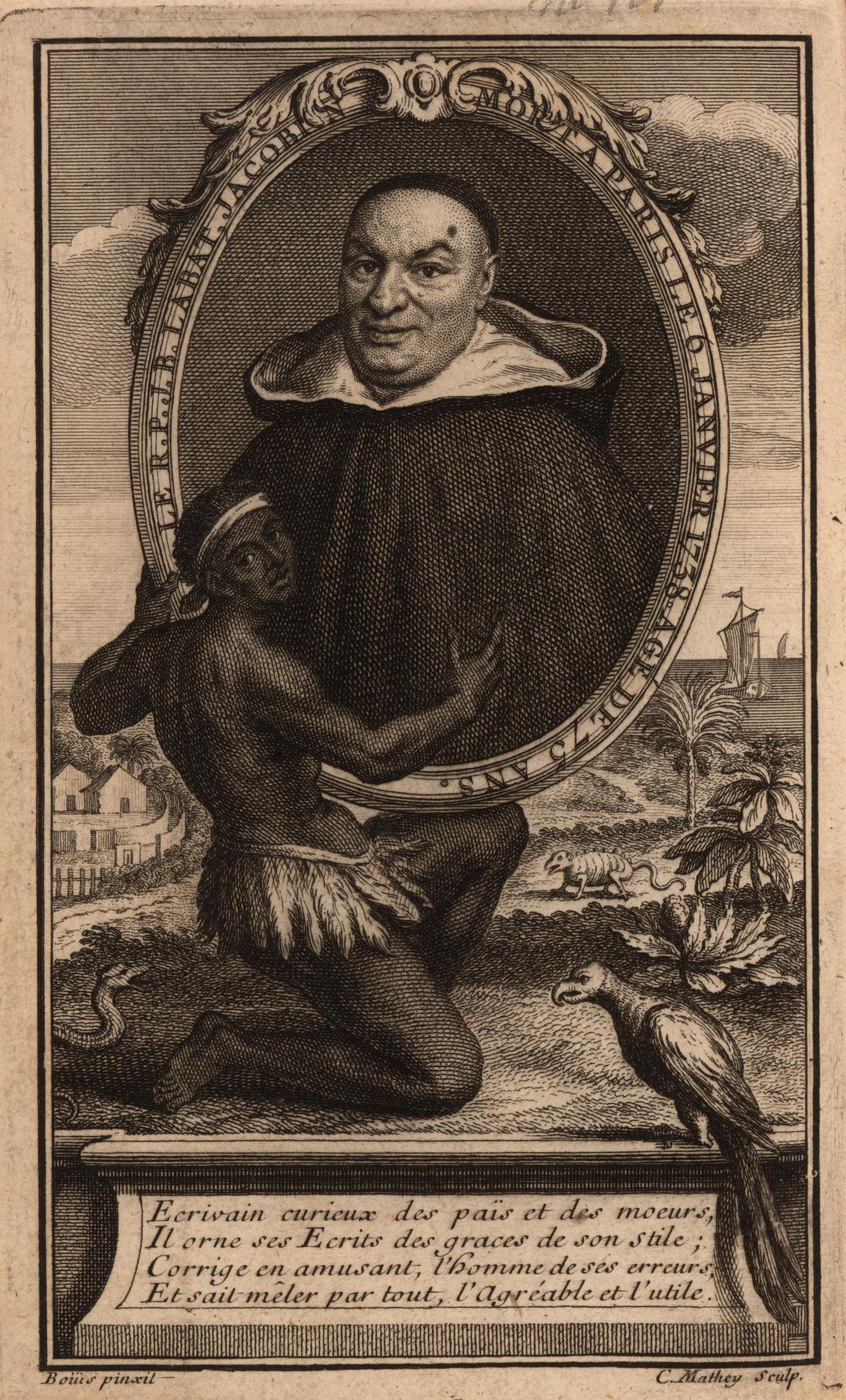
- Born: 1663 near Paris, France
- Died: 6 January 1738 (aged 74–75); Paris, France

Ecclesiastical career
- Church: Roman Catholic
- Writings: Nouveau voyage aux iles de l'Amerique and Voyage du Chevalier Demarchais en Guinee, iles voisines, et a Cayenne, fait en 1725, 1726, et 1727

Jean-Baptiste Labat (sometimes called, simply, Père Labat) (1663 – 6 January 1738) was a French clergyman, botanist, writer, explorer, ethnographer, soldier, engineer, and landowner.

== Life ==
Labat was born and died in Paris. He entered the order of the Dominicans at the age of twenty. He was ordained at the completion of his philosophical and theological studies. Besides preaching, he taught philosophy and mathematics to secular students at Nancy. Abandoning this work, he devoted himself to missionary activity and for many years preached in the various churches of France.

In 1693, determined to devote himself to foreign missionary work, he received permission from the general of his order to travel to the West Indies, then under French domination. On 29 January 1694, he landed in Martinique. He was entrusted with the parish of Macouba, where he labored for two years and added many new buildings, including the church.

In 1696 he travelled to Guadeloupe, and was appointed procurator-general of all the Dominican convents in the Antilles (Procureur syndic des îles d'Amérique) upon his return to Martinique.

The French government appointed him as an engineer due to his scientific knowledge. In this capacity, he visited the French, Dutch, and English Antilles from Grenada to Hispaniola. Labat encountered many aspects of Caribbean society, including slavery. In his account for the year 1698, Labat included his impressions regarding the slaves of Martinique: "The dance is their favourite passion. I don't think that there is a people on the face of the earth who are more attached to it than they. When the Master will not allow them to dance on the Estate, they will travel three and four leagues, as soon as they knock off work at the sugar-works on Saturday, and betake themselves to some place where they know that there will be a dance."

Labat was no simple observer of slavery, however. As proprietor of the estate of Fonds-Saint-Jacques (in the north, alongside a river of the same name) and founder of the parish of François, both on Martinique, Labat applied himself to modernizing and developing the sugar industry on this island, and owned his own slaves. However, French scholar Suzanne C. Toczyski reveals a significant tension between, on the one hand, the missionary's infamous acceptance and promotion of slaves as a property to be used (and abused), and, on the other, his appreciation of the slaves as a potential source of knowledge and, more significantly, as others to know, as representatives of a culture of interest from Labat's protoanthropological perspective. Fonds-Saint-Jacques was for a long time regarded as a model to be copied. On Martinique, Labat's memory has survived in the vocabulary: La Tour du père Labat ("windmill"); les chaudières Père Labat (the Père Labat boilers"), or the standard of distillation known as type Père Labat.

As an engineer in Guadeloupe, he took an active part in its defense when the British attacked the island in 1703. Labat fired several cannon with his own hand. He was appointed Vice-Préfet Apostolique in the same year.

In 1706, Labat was sent to Europe as deputy of his order. He spent several years in Italy and attended a meeting of the order at Bologna, presenting to the general a report of his work. Labat prepared to return to America, but was denied permission and detained in Rome for several years. He traveled to Paris in 1716. He lived in the convent on Rue Saint-Honore until his death. During these years, Labat commenced a long contemplated history of the West Indies. The work was finally published in six volumes at Paris, in 1722, with copious illustrations made by himself (Nouveau Voyage aux isles Françoises de l'Amérique, Paris, 1722).

== Legacy ==
- On Martinique, Labat devised new methods for the manufacture of sugar, which remained in use for a long time.
- Labat had a wide reputation as a mathematician and won recognition both as a naturalist and as a scientist. He assisted the botanist Charles Plumier in his work, while Plumier was in the West Indies. He embodied in the history his scientific observations and treated comprehensively and accurately of the soil, trees, plants, fruits, and herbs of the islands. He also explained the manufactures then in existence and pointed out means for the development of commercial relations.
- His books that deal with America, "best-sellers" during their time, are Nouveau voyage aux iles de l'Amerique (6 vols., Paris, 1722; 2d ed., 8 vols., 1742; Dutch translation, 4 vols., Amsterdam, 1725; German, 6 vols., Nuremberg, 1783-'7); and Voyage du Chevalier Demarchais en Guinee, iles voisines, et a Cayenne, fait en 1725, 1726, et 1727 (4 vols., Paris, 1730).
- He published similar works on other countries, drawing information from the notes of other missionaries. His two works on Africa have become well known: Nouvelle relation de l'Afrique occidentale (Paris, 1728) and Relation historique de l'Ethiopie occidentale (Congo, Angola, Matamba, after the Italian of Father Cavazzi, Cap. (Paris, 1732).

The genus of the tropical fruit tree family Sapotaceae Labatia, first described in 1788, was named after Labat. It was maintained as a distinct entity until the 1930s when it was submerged in the genus Pouteria. In 1972, it was proposed that a new genus called Neolabatia be recognized, containing six species formerly known as Labatia, but this classification is disputed.
