= Barfussia laxissima =

Scientific classification
- Kingdom: Plantae
- Clade: Embryophytes
- Clade: Tracheophytes
- Clade: Spermatophytes
- Clade: Angiosperms
- Clade: Monocots
- Clade: Commelinids
- Order: Poales
- Family: Bromeliaceae
- Subfamily: Tillandsioideae
- Genus: Barfussia
- Species: B. laxissima

Binomial name
- Barfussia laxissima (Mez) Manzan. & W.Till

Synonyms
- Tillandsia laxissima Mez

Species of plant

Barfussia laxissima is a species of flowering plant in the family Bromeliaceae. This species is endemic to Bolivia.
