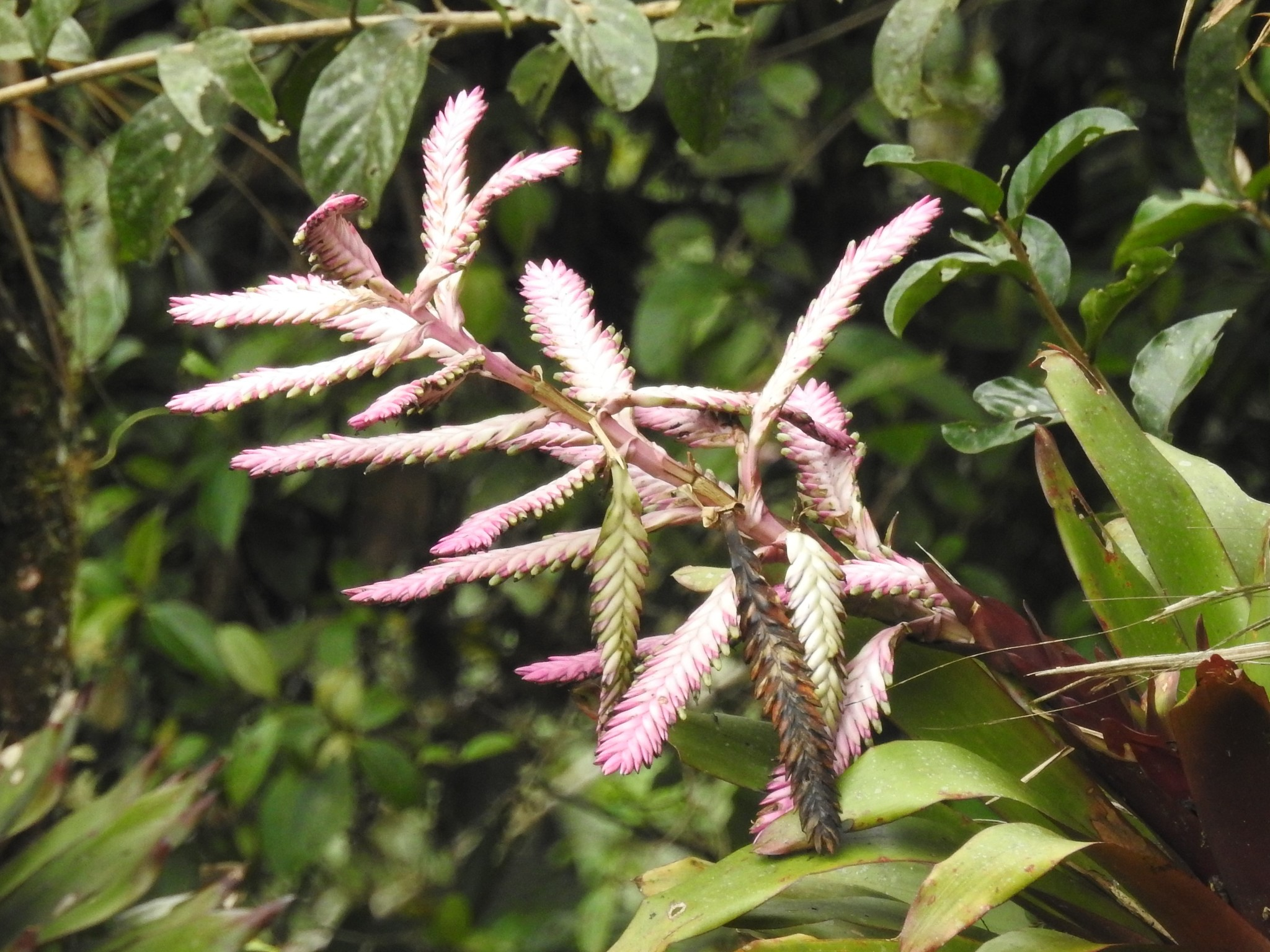

Scientific classification
- Kingdom: Plantae
- Clade: Embryophytes
- Clade: Tracheophytes
- Clade: Spermatophytes
- Clade: Angiosperms
- Clade: Monocots
- Clade: Commelinids
- Order: Poales
- Family: Bromeliaceae
- Subfamily: Tillandsioideae
- Genus: Barfussia
- Species: B. platyrhachis

Binomial name
- Barfussia platyrhachis (Mez) Manzan. & W.Till

Synonyms
- Homotypic Synonyms: Tillandsia platyrhachis Mez; Heterotypic Synonyms: Tillandsia platyrhachis var. alba Rauh & Hirtz; Tillandsia platyrhachis var. magnifica Rauh & von Bismarck

= Barfussia platyrhachis =

Species of epiphyte

Barfussia platyrhachis is a species of flowering plant in the family Bromeliaceae. This species is native to Colombia, Peru, and Ecuador.

== Cultivars ==
There are at least 500 cultivars, including the following:

- Tillandsia 'Creation'
- Tillandsia 'Hercules'
