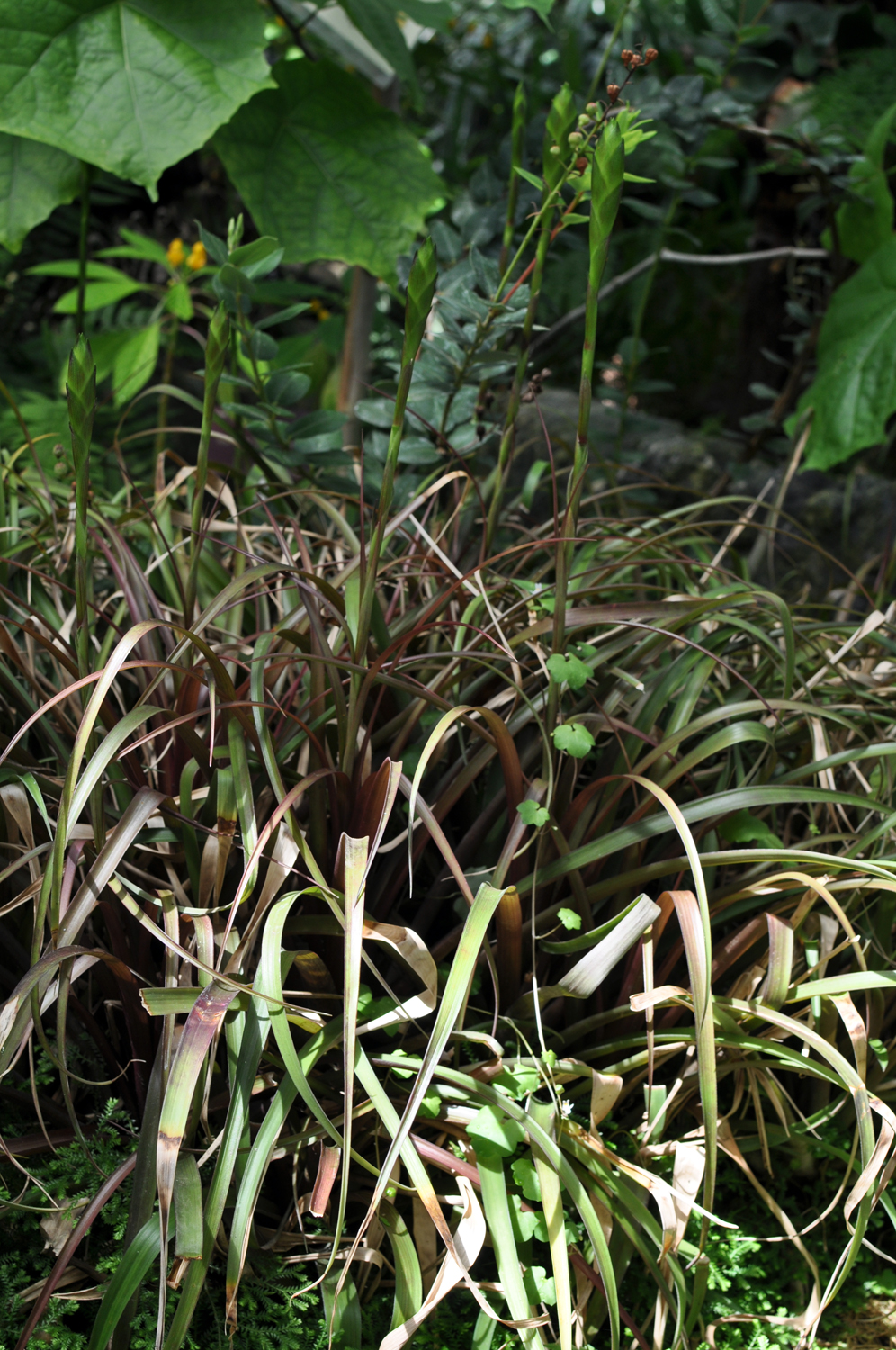

Scientific classification
- Kingdom: Plantae
- Clade: Tracheophytes
- Clade: Angiosperms
- Clade: Monocots
- Clade: Commelinids
- Order: Poales
- Family: Bromeliaceae
- Subfamily: Tillandsioideae
- Genus: Wallisia
- Species: W. lindeniana

Binomial name
- Wallisia lindeniana (Regel) É.Morren

Synonyms
- Phytarrhiza lindenii var. regeliana (É.Morren) É.Morren; Tillandsia lindeniana Regel; Tillandsia lindenii Regel; Tillandsia lindenii var. regeliana É.Morren; Vriesea lindenii Lem.; Tillandsia umbellata André

= Wallisia lindeniana =

Species of plant

Wallisia lindeniana is a species of flowering plant in the genus Wallisia. It is endemic to Ecuador.

== Cultivars ==
- Tillandsia 'Caeca'
- Tillandsia 'Duvaliana'
- Tillandsia 'Duvalii'
- Tillandsia 'Emilie'
- Tillandsia 'Pink Plume'
