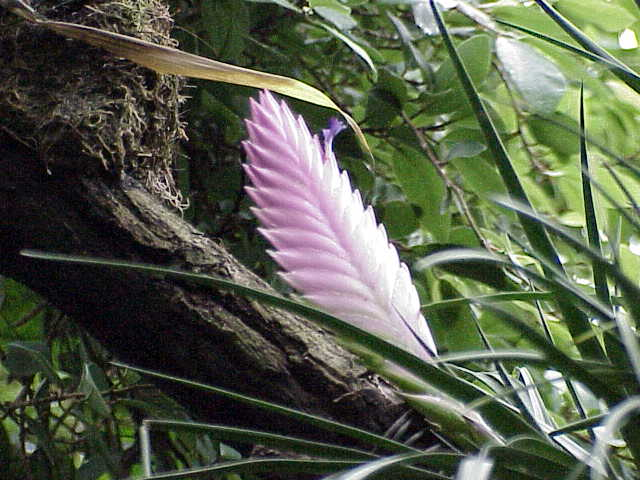

Conservation status
- Near Threatened (IUCN 3.1)

Scientific classification
- Kingdom: Plantae
- Clade: Tracheophytes
- Clade: Angiosperms
- Clade: Monocots
- Clade: Commelinids
- Order: Poales
- Family: Bromeliaceae
- Subfamily: Tillandsioideae
- Genus: Wallisia
- Species: W. cyanea

Binomial name
- Wallisia cyanea Barfuss & W.Till

Synonyms
- Phytarrhiza lindenii É.Morren; Tillandsia cyanea L.B.Sm.; Tillandsia lindenii K.Koch; Tillandsia morreniana Regel; Wallisia lindenii É.Morren

= Wallisia cyanea =

Species of flowering plant

Wallisia cyanea, or pink quill, is a species of plant of the genus Wallisia in the bromeliad family, native to the rainforests of Ecuador. An epiphytic perennial growing to 50 cm (20 in) high by 50 cm (20 in) wide, it has stemless rosettes of thin, recurved leaves and paddle-shaped spikes of 20 pink bracts with violet flowers, in spring and autumn.

The Latin specific epithet cyanea means "blue", referring to the intense purple-violet hue of the flowers.

With a minimum temperature of 7 °C (45 °F), this plant is often cultivated as a low-maintenance houseplant in temperate regions, often sold alongside orchids or by itself. It has gained the Royal Horticultural Society's Award of Garden Merit.

Wallisia cyanea was formerly placed in Tillandsia, but following DNA analysis, was reassigned to Wallisia.

Cultivars of W. cyanea include Wallisia 'Anita' and Wallisia 'Sandy'.

== Gallery ==
Wallisia cyanea

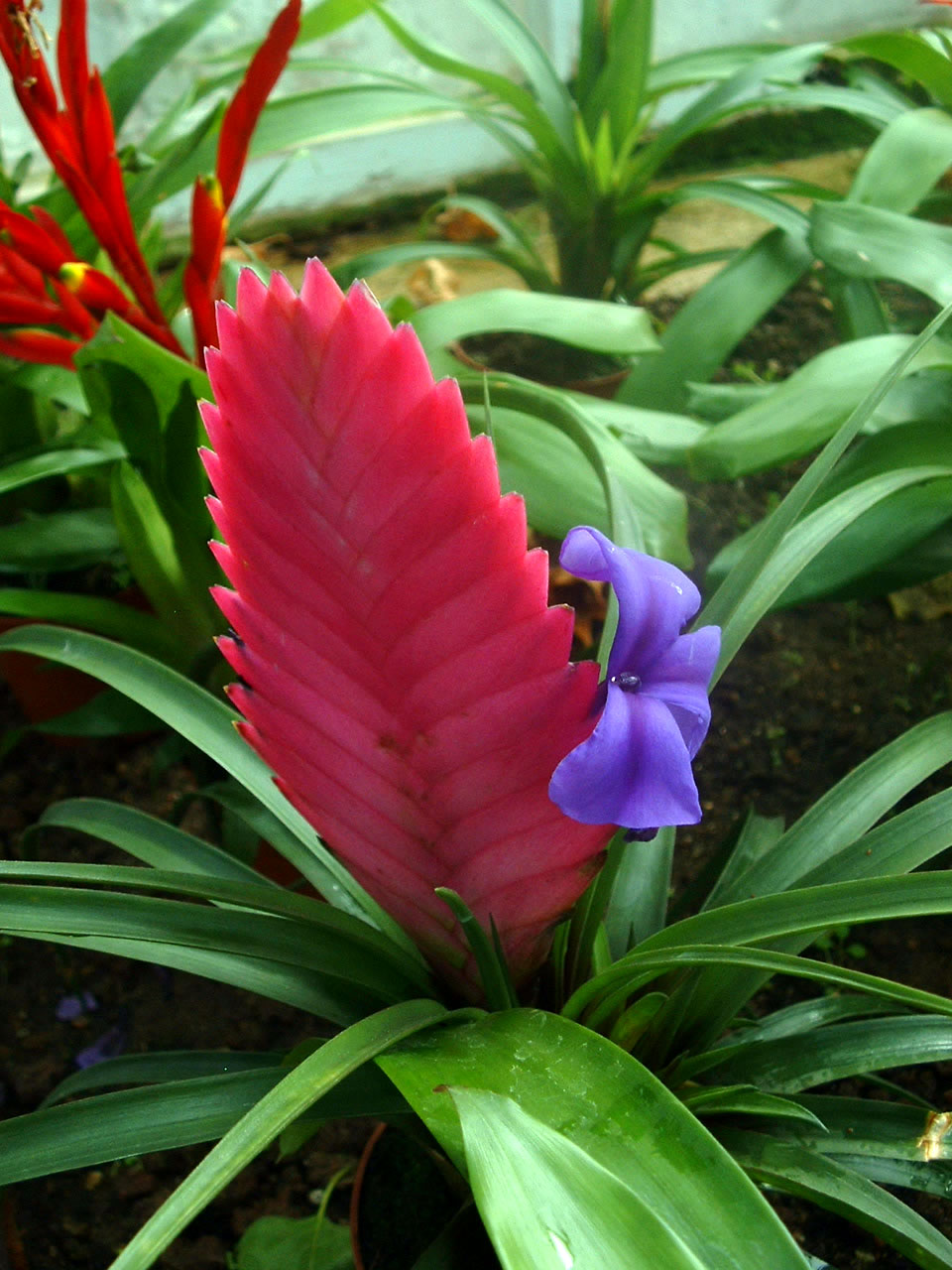
Blue inflorescence

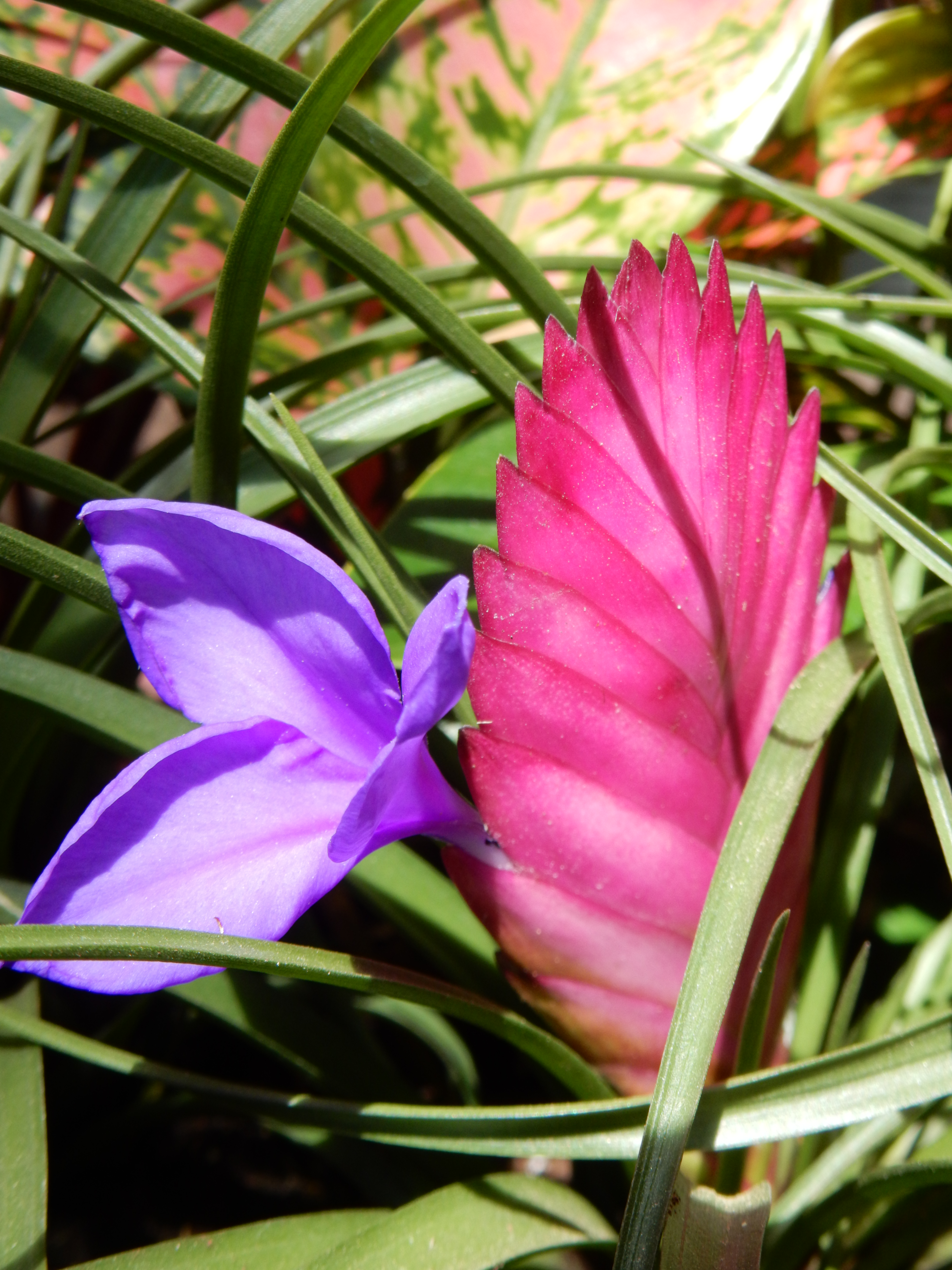
Blue inflorescence

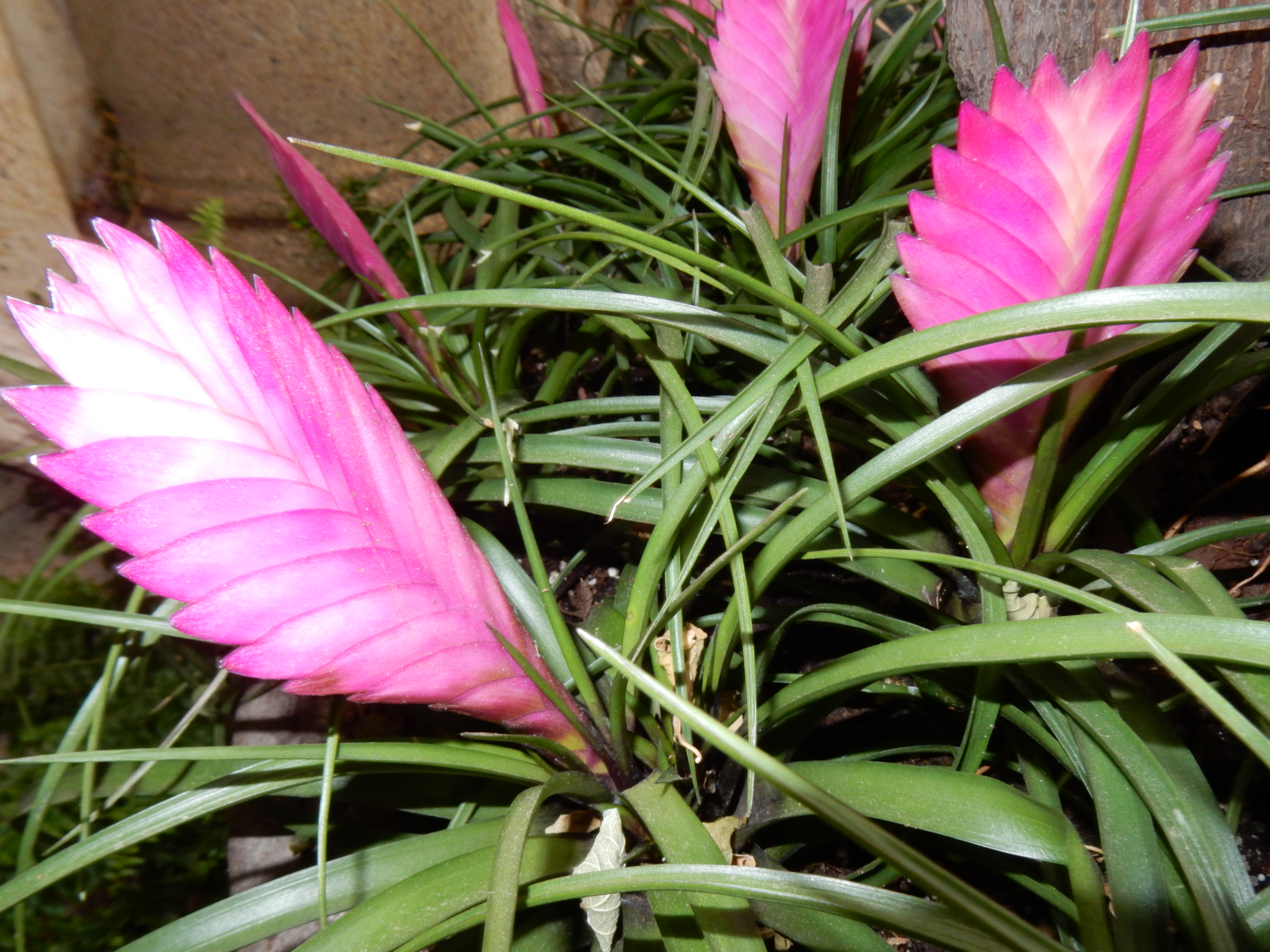
Pink spikes of bracts

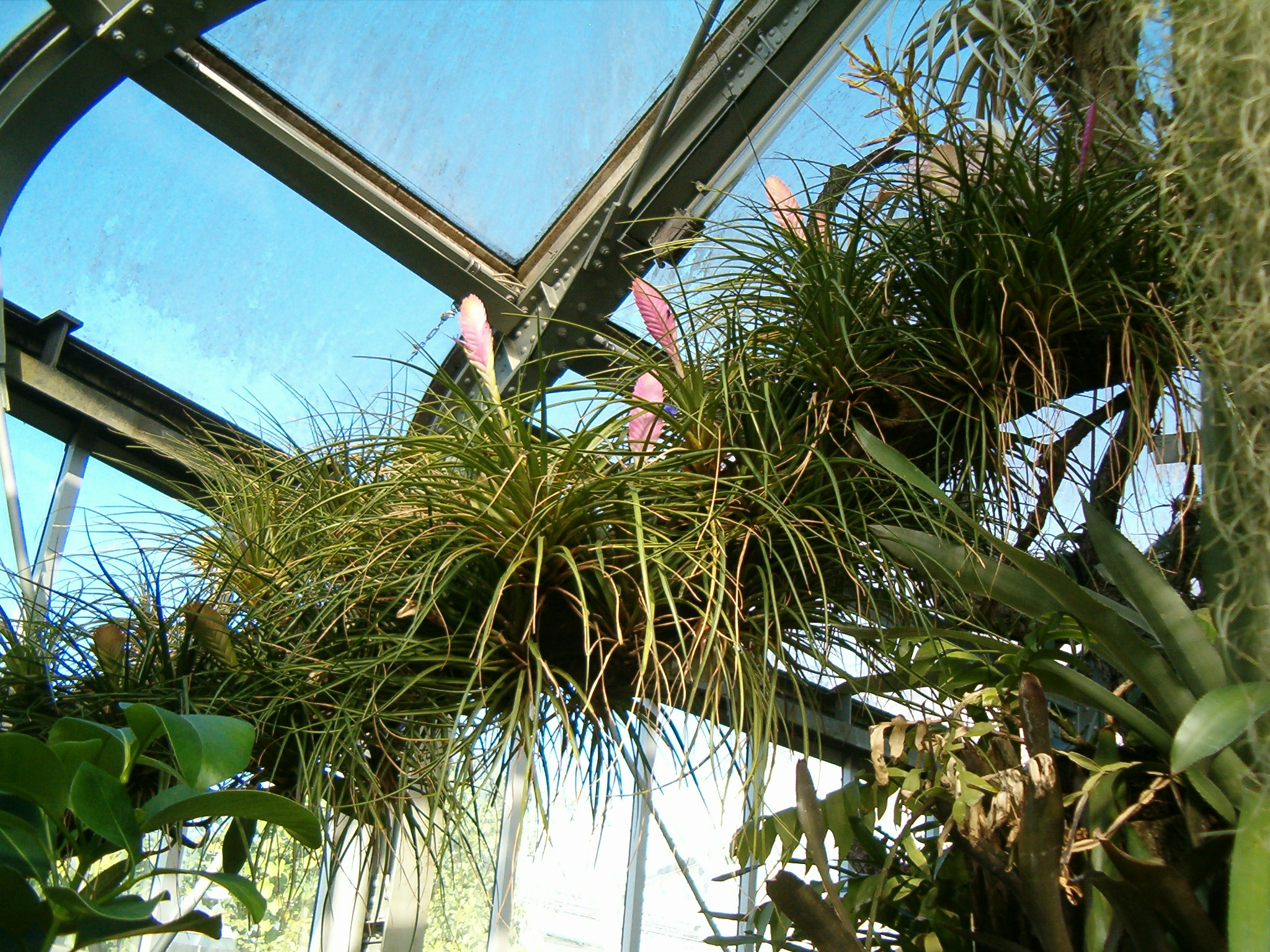
Plants in cultivation
