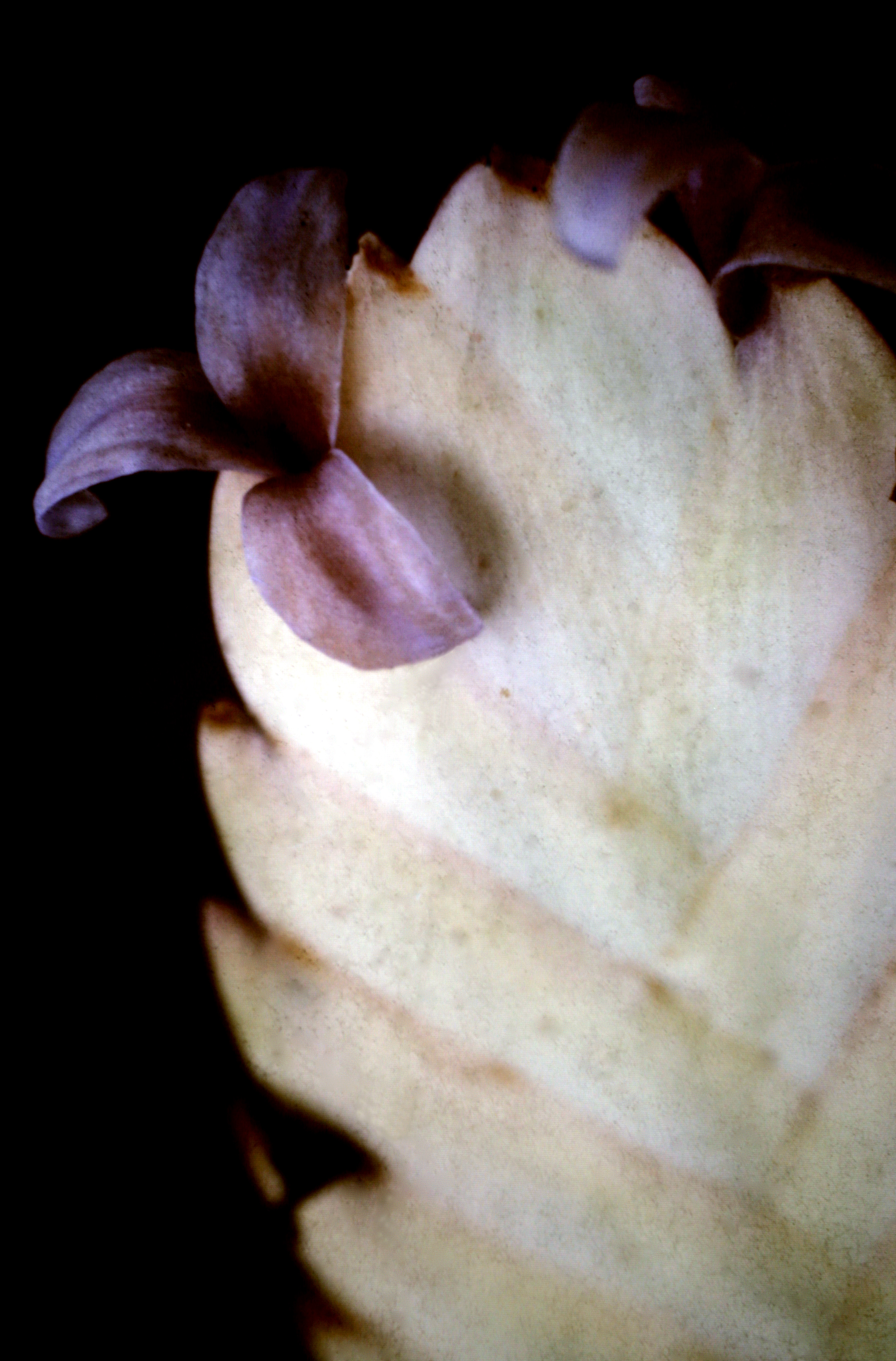

Scientific classification
- Kingdom: Plantae
- Clade: Tracheophytes
- Clade: Angiosperms
- Clade: Monocots
- Clade: Commelinids
- Order: Poales
- Family: Bromeliaceae
- Subfamily: Tillandsioideae
- Genus: Wallisia
- Species: W. anceps

Binomial name
- Wallisia anceps (G.Lodd.) Barfuss & W.Till

Synonyms
- Vriesea anceps (G.Lodd.) Lem.; Tillandsia anceps G.Lodd.; Platystachys anceps (G.Lodd.) Beer; Phytarrhiza anceps (G.Lodd.) E.Morren; Tillandsia xiphostachys Griseb.; Vriesea schlechtendalii var. alba Wittm.; Tillandsia lineatifolia Mez

= Wallisia anceps =

Species of plant

Wallisia anceps is a species of flowering plant in the genus Wallisia. This species is native to Central America, Colombia, Ecuador, Trinidad and Tobago, the Guianas, Venezuela and northern Brazil.
