= Lemeltonia monadelpha =

Scientific classification
- Kingdom: Plantae
- Clade: Tracheophytes
- Clade: Angiosperms
- Clade: Monocots
- Clade: Commelinids
- Order: Poales
- Family: Bromeliaceae
- Subfamily: Tillandsioideae
- Genus: Lemeltonia
- Species: L. monadelpha

Binomial name
- Lemeltonia monadelpha (É.Morren) Barfuss & W.Till

Synonyms
- Phytarrhiza monadelpha É.Morren; Tillandsia monadelpha (É.Morren) Baker; Catopsis alba É.Morren ex Baker; Tillandsia graminifolia Baker; Tillandsia monobotrya Mez

Species of plant

Lemeltonia monadelpha is a species of flowering plant in the genus Lemeltonia. This species is native to Trinidad and Tobago, Central America, and northern South America (Colombia, northern Brazil, the Guianas, Venezuela and Ecuador).
