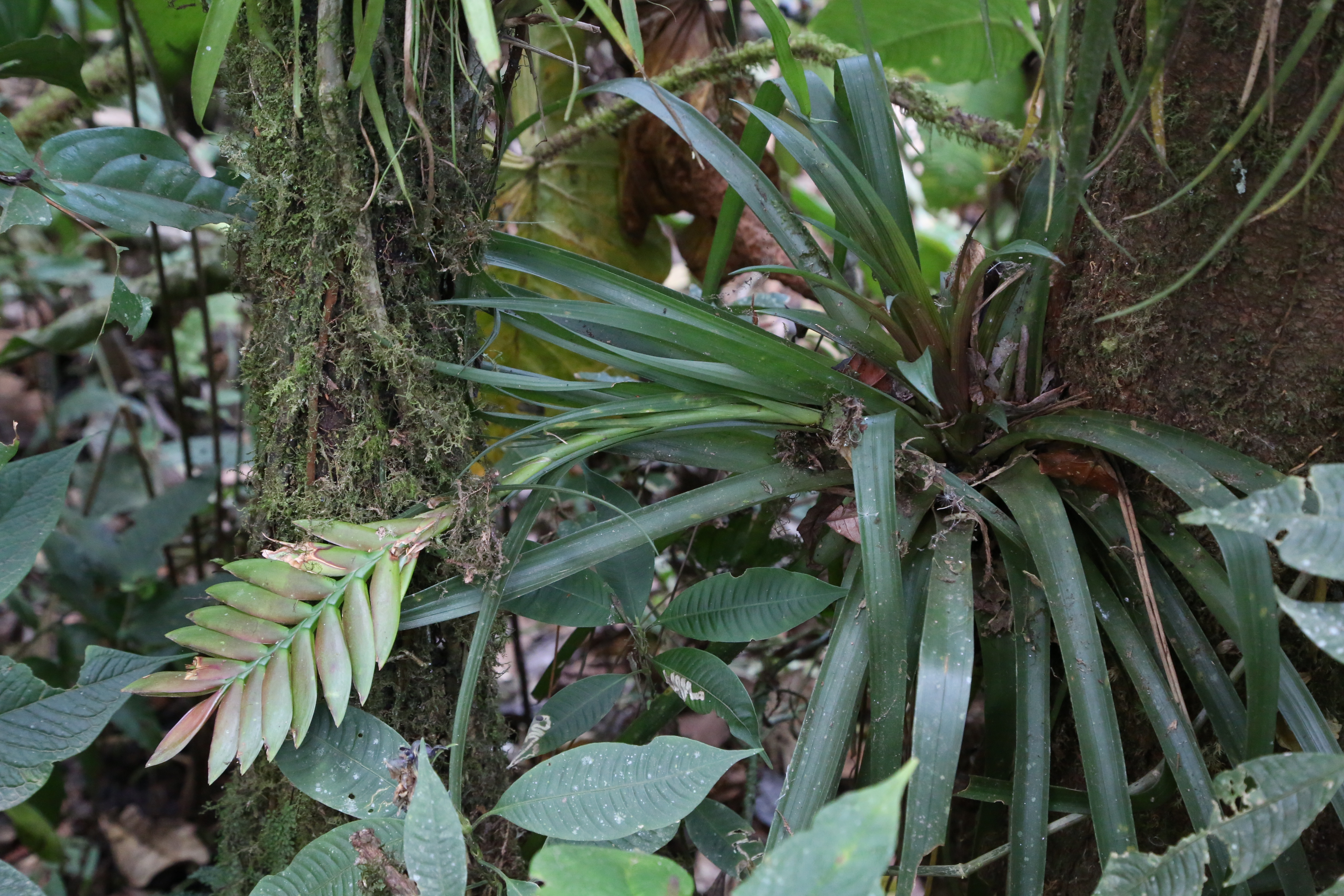
- In Pichincha Province, Ecuador

Conservation status
- Vulnerable (IUCN 3.1)

Scientific classification
- Kingdom: Plantae
- Clade: Embryophytes
- Clade: Tracheophytes
- Clade: Spermatophytes
- Clade: Angiosperms
- Clade: Monocots
- Clade: Commelinids
- Order: Poales
- Family: Bromeliaceae
- Subfamily: Tillandsioideae
- Genus: Wallisia
- Species: W. pretiosa

Binomial name
- Wallisia pretiosa Mez Barfuss & W.Till

Synonyms
- Homotypic Synonyms: Tillandsia pretiosa Mez; Heterotypic Synonyms: Tillandsia cyanea var. elatior L.B.Sm.; Tillandsia cyanea var. tricolor (André) L.B.Sm.; Tillandsia lindenii var. tricolor André

= Wallisia pretiosa =

Species of plant

Wallisia pretiosa is a species of flowering plant in the family Bromeliaceae. It is endemic to Ecuador. Its natural habitats are subtropical or tropical moist lowland forests and subtropical or tropical moist montane forests.
