= Lutheria bi-beatricis =

Scientific classification
- Kingdom: Plantae
- Clade: Tracheophytes
- Clade: Angiosperms
- Clade: Monocots
- Clade: Commelinids
- Order: Poales
- Family: Bromeliaceae
- Subfamily: Tillandsioideae
- Genus: Lutheria
- Species: L. bi-beatricis

Binomial name
- Lutheria bi-beatricis (Morillo) Barfuss & W.Till

Synonyms
- Vriesea bi-beatricis Morillo

Species of plant

Lutheria bi-beatricis is a species of flowering plant in the family Bromeliaceae. This species is endemic to Venezuela.
