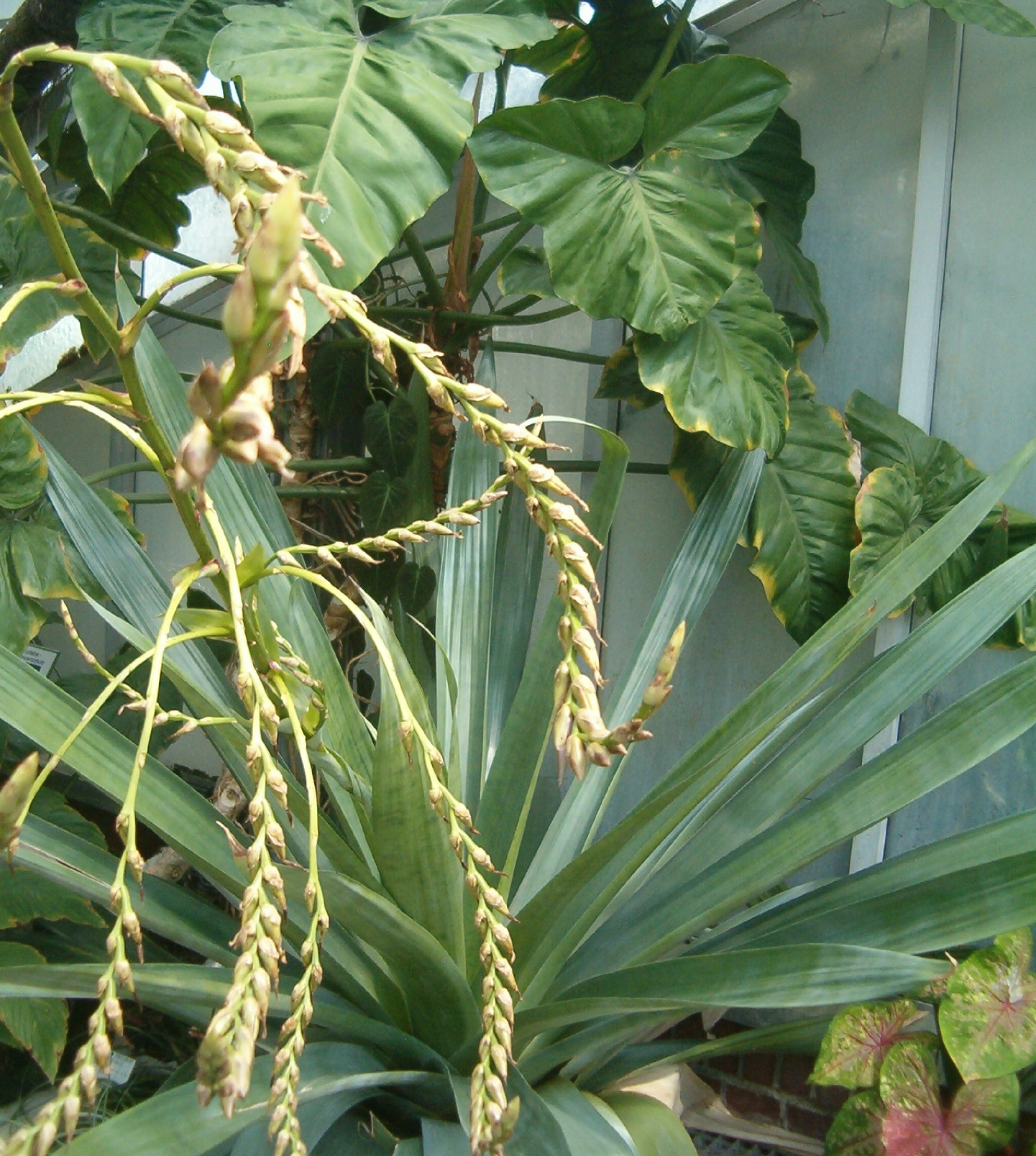

Scientific classification
- Kingdom: Plantae
- Clade: Embryophytes
- Clade: Tracheophytes
- Clade: Spermatophytes
- Clade: Angiosperms
- Clade: Monocots
- Clade: Commelinids
- Order: Poales
- Family: Bromeliaceae
- Subfamily: Tillandsioideae
- Genus: Zizkaea; W.Till & Barfuss
- Species: Z. tuerckheimii

Binomial name
- Zizkaea tuerckheimii (Mez) W.Till & Barfuss

= Zizkaea =

Species of flowering plant

Zizkaea is a monotypic genus of flowering plants belonging to the family Bromeliaceae. It only contains one known species, Zizkaea tuerckheimii.

== Taxonomy ==
The genus name of Zizkaea is in honour of Georg Zizka (b. 1955), a German evolutionary botanist and also specialist in Bromeliaceae. The Latin specific epithet of tuerckheimii refers to Hans von Türckheim (1853-1920), a German plant collector. Both the genus and the species were first described and published in Phytotaxa Vol.279 on page 55 in 2016.

== Distribution ==
It is native to the Dominican Republic and Haiti on the island of Hispaniola.
