= Stigmatodon belloi =

Scientific classification
- Kingdom: Plantae
- Clade: Tracheophytes
- Clade: Angiosperms
- Clade: Monocots
- Clade: Commelinids
- Order: Poales
- Family: Bromeliaceae
- Genus: Stigmatodon
- Species: S. belloi

Binomial name
- Stigmatodon belloi (Leme) Leme, G.K.Br. & Barfuss

Synonyms
- Vriesea belloi Leme

Species of flowering plant

Stigmatodon belloi, is a species of flowering plant in the family Bromeliaceae. This species is endemic to Brazil.
