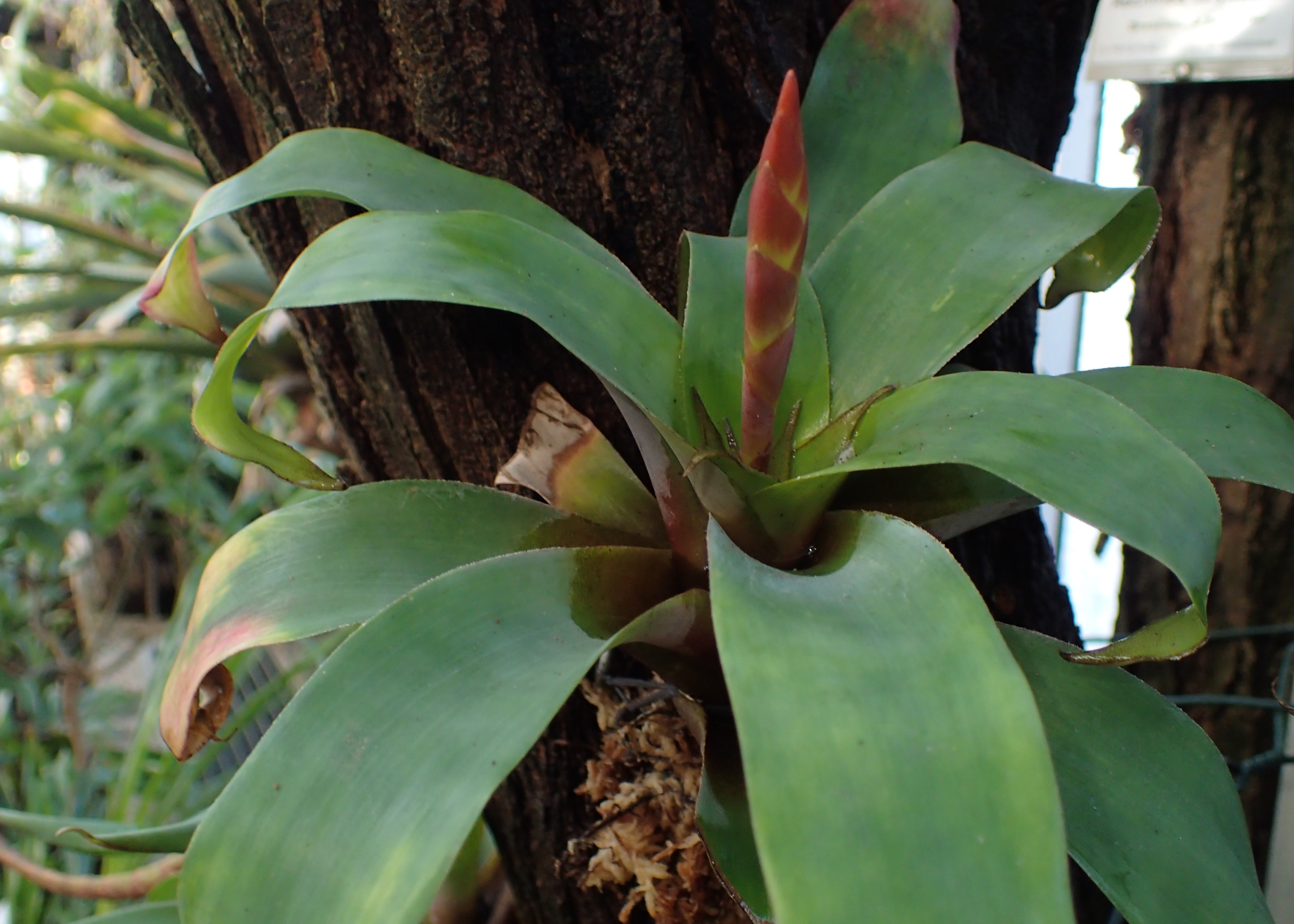
- Goudaea chrysostachys

Scientific classification
- Kingdom: Plantae
- Clade: Tracheophytes
- Clade: Angiosperms
- Clade: Monocots
- Clade: Commelinids
- Order: Poales
- Family: Bromeliaceae
- Subfamily: Tillandsioideae
- Genus: Goudaea; W.Till & Barfuss

Type species
- Goudaea chrysostachys

= Goudaea =

Genus of plants

Goudaea is a genus of flowering plants belonging to the family Bromeliaceae.

Its native range is Trinidad, Bolivia, Colombia and Peru.

The genus name of Goudaea is in honour of Eric Gouda (b. 1957), Dutch botanist; specialist in Bromeliaceae. It was first described and published in Phytotaxa Vol.279 on page 51 in 2016.

Known species, according to Kew:

Image	Scientific name	Distribution
	Goudaea chrysostachys (É.Morren) W.Till & Barfuss	Bolivia, Colombia, Peru, Trinidad-Tobago
	Goudaea ospinae (H.Luther) W.Till & Barfuss	Colombia
