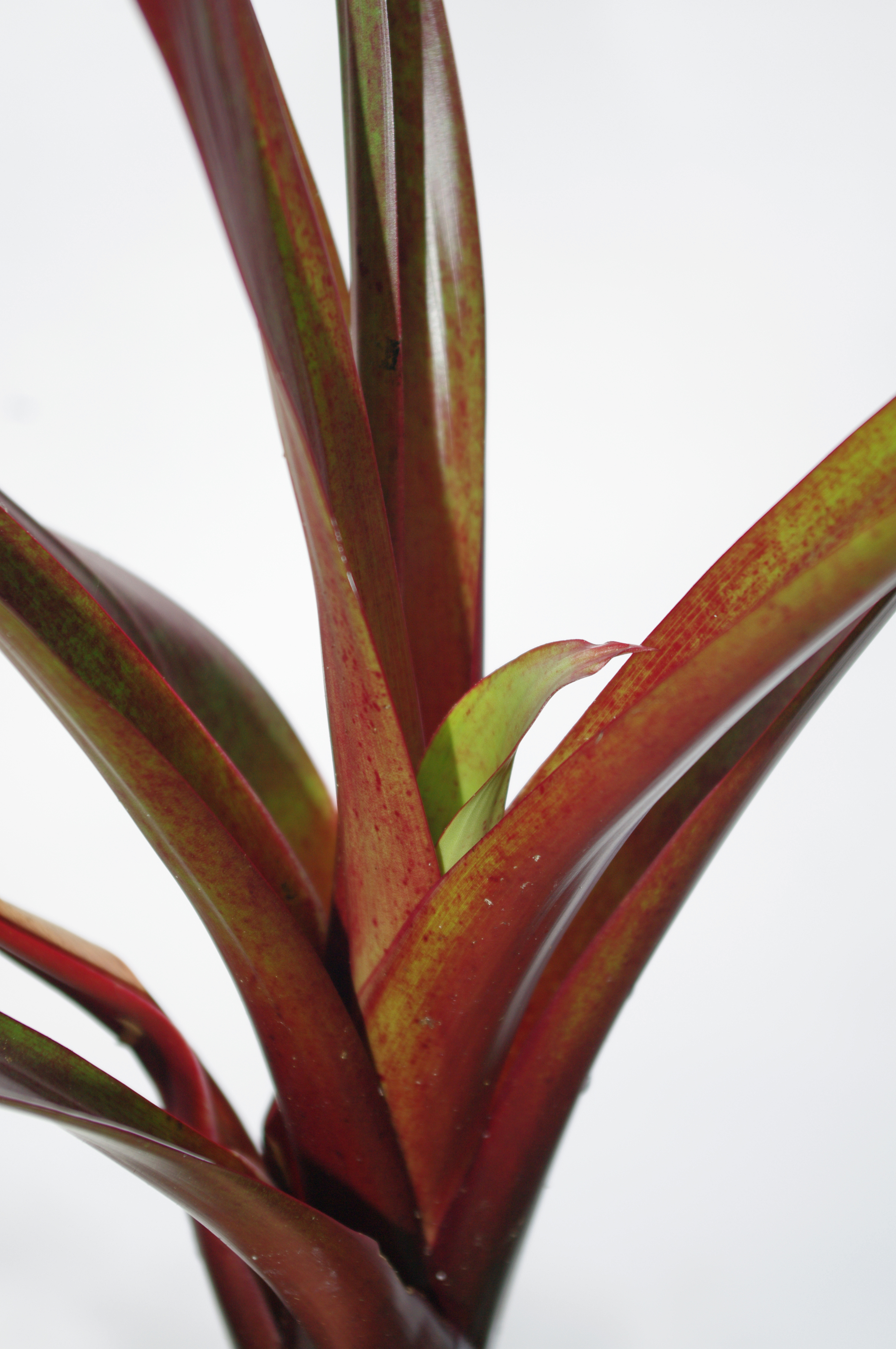

Scientific classification
- Kingdom: Plantae
- Clade: Tracheophytes
- Clade: Angiosperms
- Clade: Monocots
- Clade: Commelinids
- Order: Poales
- Family: Bromeliaceae
- Genus: Alcantarea
- Species: A. vinicolor

Binomial name
- Alcantarea vinicolor (E. Pereira & Reitz) J.R. Grant

= Alcantarea vinicolor =

Species of flowering plant

Alcantarea vinicolor is a plant species in the genus Alcantarea. This species is endemic to Brazil.

== Cultivars ==
- Alcantarea 'Tarawera'
