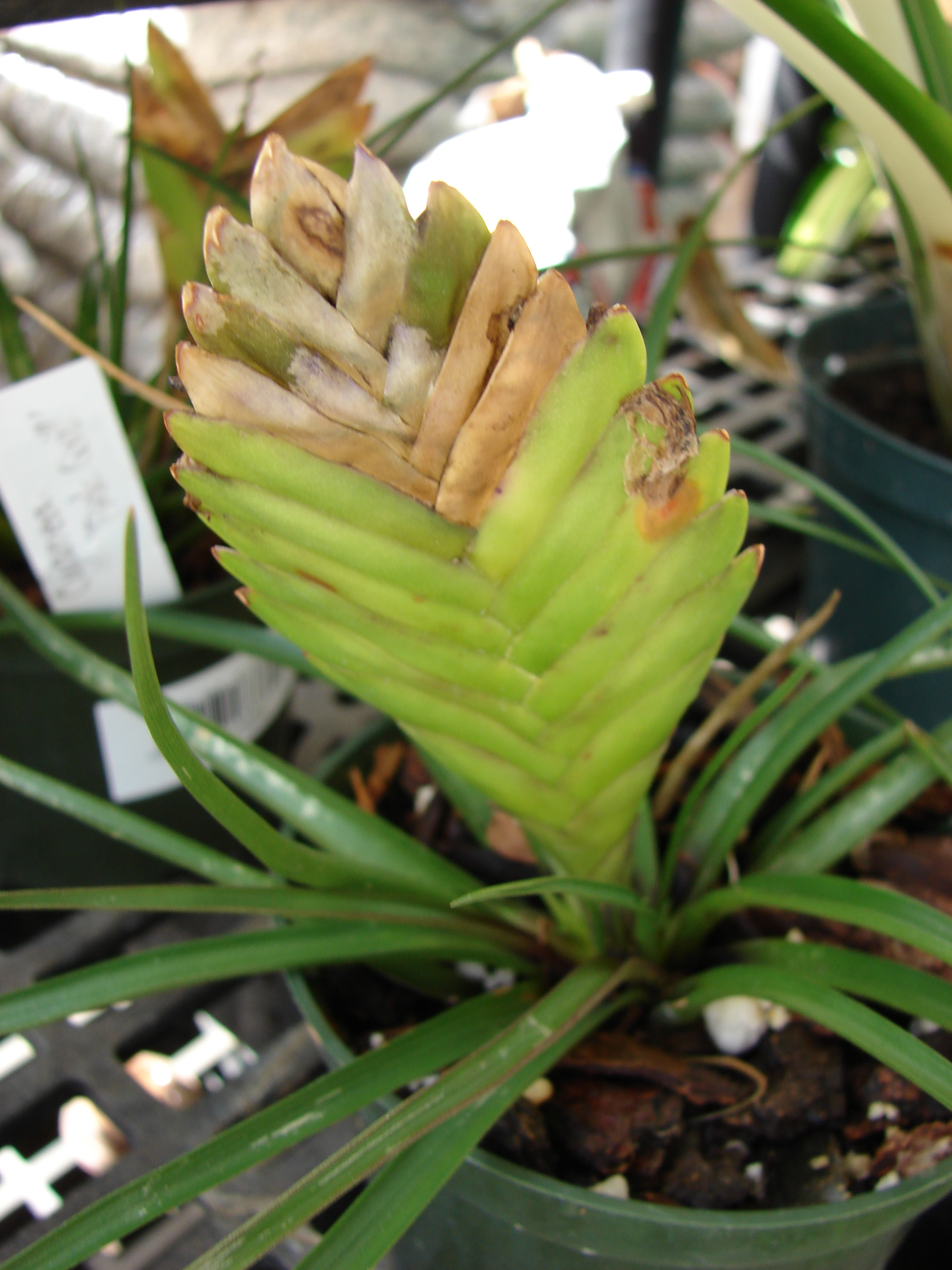
- Wallisia lindeniana (syn Tillandsia lindenii)

Scientific classification
- Kingdom: Plantae
- Clade: Tracheophytes
- Clade: Angiosperms
- Clade: Monocots
- Clade: Commelinids
- Order: Poales
- Family: Bromeliaceae
- Subfamily: Tillandsioideae
- Genus: Wallisia (Regel) É.Morren

Type species
- Wallisia lindeniana

= Wallisia =

Genus of flowering plants

Wallisia is a genus of flowering plants belonging to the family Bromeliaceae. It is also in the Tillandsioideae subfamily.

Its native range is central and southern Tropical America (within Belize, northern Brazil, Colombia, Costa Rica, Ecuador, French Guiana, Guatemala, Guyana, Honduras, Nicaragua, Panamá, Peru, Suriname and Venezuela) and Trinidad and Tobago (in the Caribbean).

== Known species ==
As accepted by Plants of the World Online As of January 2023:

Image	Scientific name	Distribution
	Wallisia anceps (G.Lodd.) Barfuss & W.Till	Central America, Colombia, Ecuador, Trinidad and Tobago, the Guianas, Venezuela and northern Brazil
	Wallisia cyanea Barfuss & W.Till	Ecuador
	Wallisia × duvalii (L.Duval) Barfuss & W.Till (W. cyanea × W. lindeniana)	Ecuador.
	Wallisia lindeniana (Regel) É.Morren	Ecuador
	Wallisia pretiosa (Mez) Barfuss & W.Till	Ecuador

The genus name of Wallisia is in honour of Gustav Wallis (1830–1878), a German plant collector. It was first described and published in Ann. Hort. Belge Étrangère Vol.20 on page 97 in 1870.
