= Lemeltonia acosta-solisii =

Conservation status
- Endangered (IUCN 3.1)

Scientific classification
- Kingdom: Plantae
- Clade: Tracheophytes
- Clade: Angiosperms
- Clade: Monocots
- Clade: Commelinids
- Order: Poales
- Family: Bromeliaceae
- Genus: Lemeltonia
- Species: L. acosta-solisii

Binomial name
- Lemeltonia acosta-solisii (Gilmartin) Barfuss & W.Till

Synonyms
- Tillandsia acosta-solisii Gilmartin

Species of plant

Lemeltonia acosta-solisii is a species of flowering plant in the family Bromeliaceae. It is an epiphyte native to southwestern Colombia and Ecuador. Its natural habitats are subtropical or tropical moist lowland forests and subtropical or tropical moist montane forests. It is threatened by habitat loss.
