= Stigmatodon amadoi =

Scientific classification
- Kingdom: Plantae
- Clade: Tracheophytes
- Clade: Angiosperms
- Clade: Monocots
- Clade: Commelinids
- Order: Poales
- Family: Bromeliaceae
- Genus: Stigmatodon
- Species: S. amadoi

Binomial name
- Stigmatodon amadoi (Leme) Leme, G.K.Br. & Barfuss

Synonyms
- Vriesea amadoi Leme

Species of flowering plant

Stigmatodon amadoi is a species of flowering plant in the family Bromeliaceae. It is endemic to Brazil.
