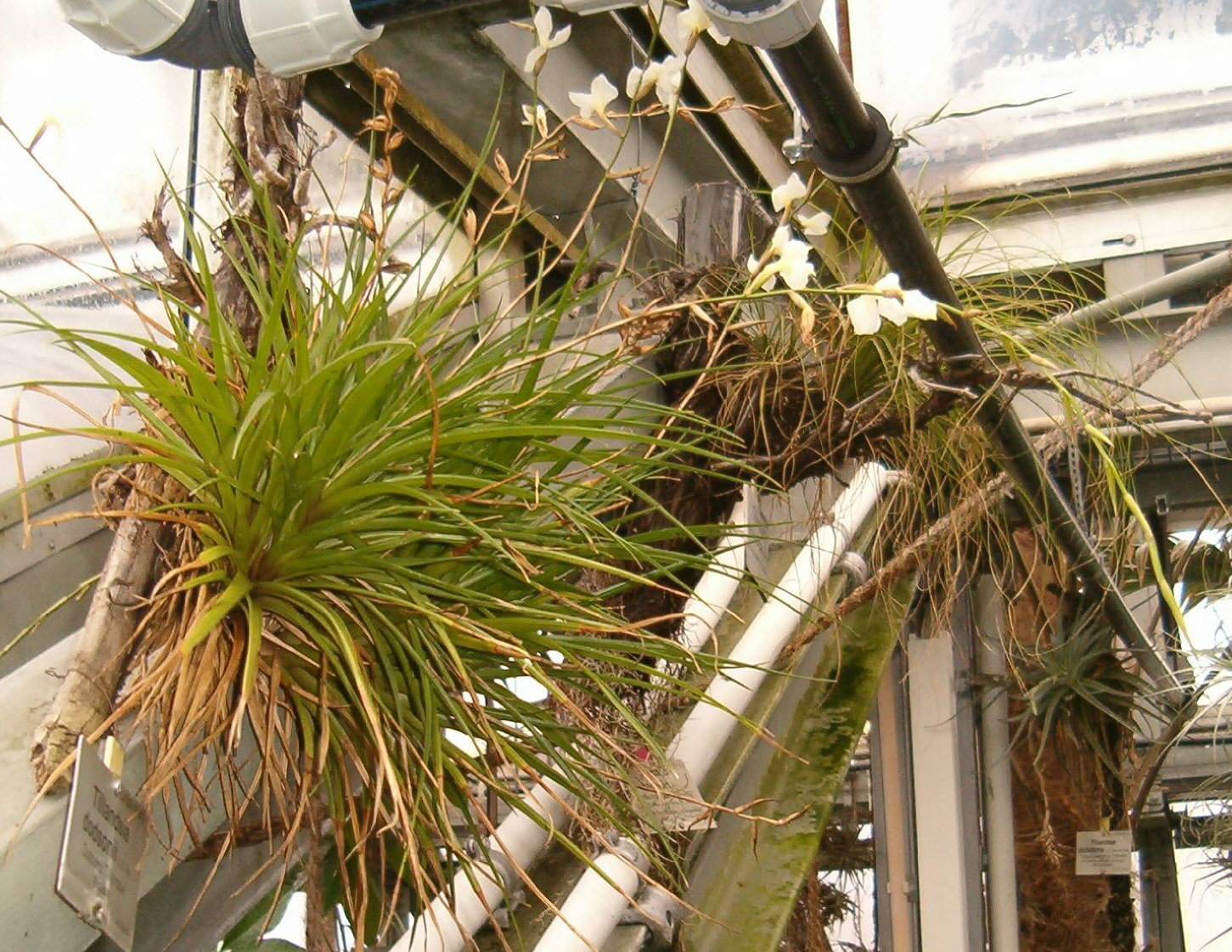
- Lemeltonia dodsonii

Scientific classification
- Kingdom: Plantae
- Clade: Tracheophytes
- Clade: Angiosperms
- Clade: Monocots
- Clade: Commelinids
- Order: Poales
- Family: Bromeliaceae
- Subfamily: Tillandsioideae
- Genus: Lemeltonia; Barfuss & W.Till

= Lemeltonia =

Genus of plants

Lemeltonia is a genus of flowering plants belonging to the family Bromeliaceae.

Its native range is Central America to north-western Peru and Trinidad. It is found in the countries of Belize, Brazil, Colombia, Costa Rica, Ecuador, French Guiana, Guatemala, Guyana, Honduras, Nicaragua, Panamá, Peru, Suriname, Trinidad-Tobago and Venezuela.

The genus name of Lemeltonia is in honour of Elton Martinez Carvalho Leme (b. 1960), a Brazilian botanist and specialist in Brazilian Bromeliaceae at a herbarium in Rio de Janeiro. It was first described and published in Phytotaxa Vol.279 on page 41 in 2016.

== Known species ==
According to Kew;

- Lemeltonia acosta-solisii (Gilmartin) Barfuss & W.Till
- Lemeltonia cornuta (Mez & Sodiro) Barfuss & W.Till
- Lemeltonia dodsonii (L.B.Sm.) Barfuss & W.Till
- Lemeltonia monadelpha (É.Morren) Barfuss & W.Till
- Lemeltonia narthecioides (C.Presl) Barfuss & W.Till
- Lemeltonia scaligera (Mez & Sodiro) Barfuss & W.Till
- Lemeltonia triglochinoides (C.Presl) Barfuss & W.Till
