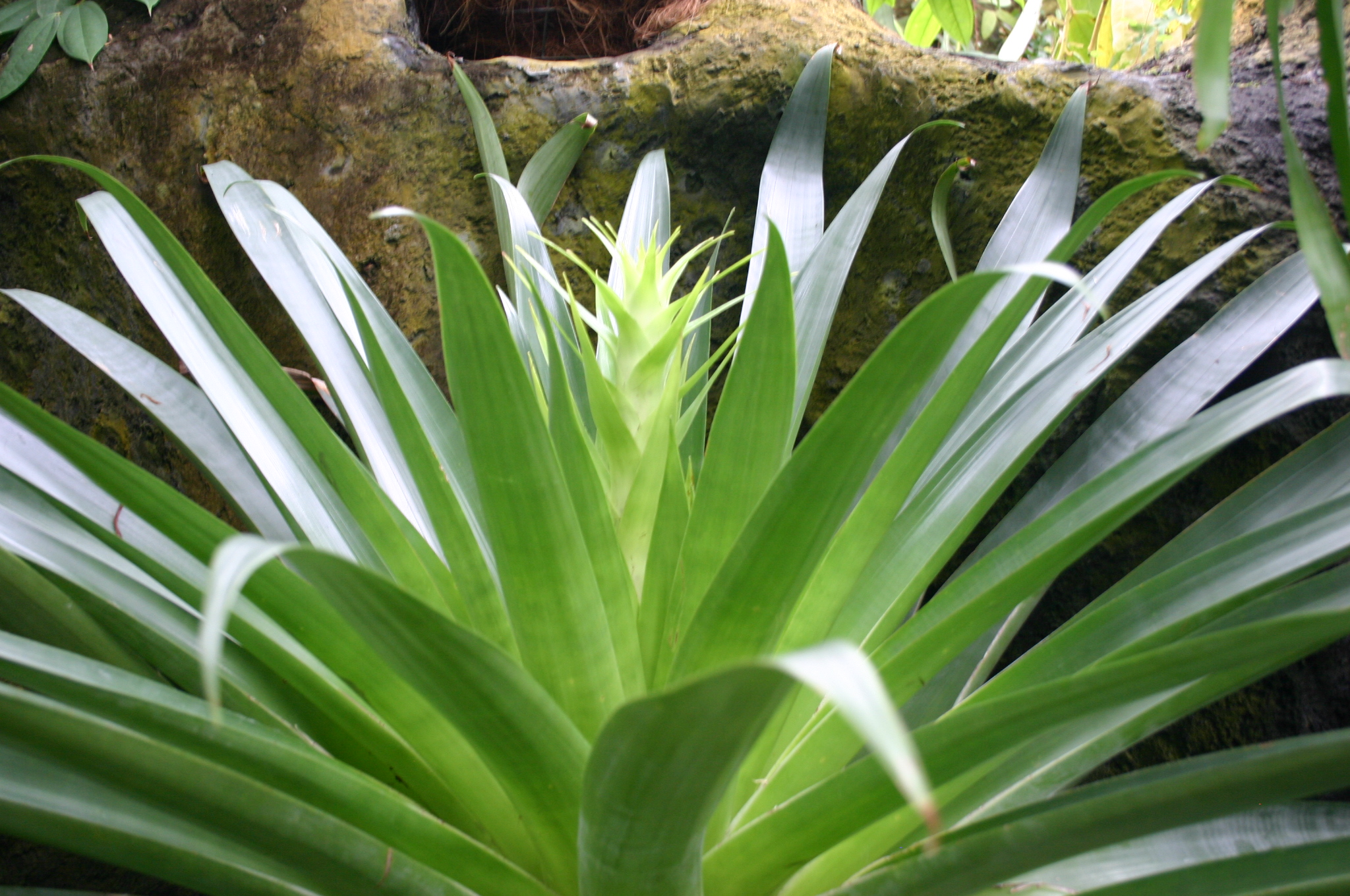

Scientific classification
- Kingdom: Plantae
- Clade: Tracheophytes
- Clade: Angiosperms
- Clade: Monocots
- Clade: Commelinids
- Order: Poales
- Family: Bromeliaceae
- Genus: Alcantarea
- Species: A. regina

Binomial name
- Alcantarea regina (Vell.) Harms

Synonyms
- Alcantarea edmundoi (Leme) J.R.Grant; Tillandsia regina Vell.; Vriesea edmundoi Leme; Vriesea hillegeeriana Baker; Vriesea regina (Vell.) Beer

= Alcantarea regina =

Species of flowering plant

Alcantarea regina is a plant species in the genus Alcantarea. This species is endemic to Brazil.
