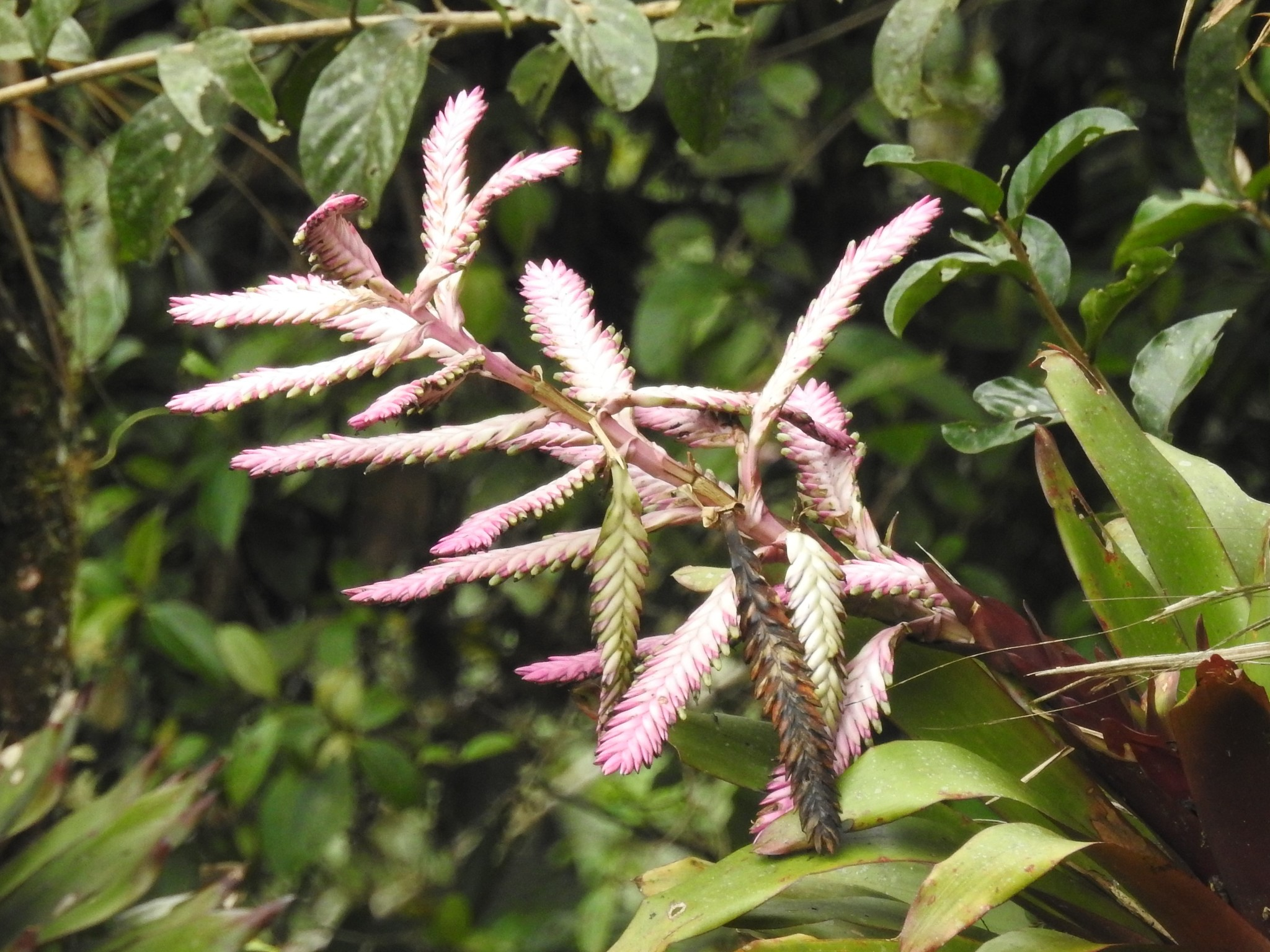
- B. platyrhachis

Scientific classification
- Kingdom: Plantae
- Clade: Tracheophytes
- Clade: Angiosperms
- Clade: Monocots
- Clade: Commelinids
- Order: Poales
- Family: Bromeliaceae
- Subfamily: Tillandsioideae
- Genus: Barfussia; Manzan. & W.Till

= Barfussia =

Genus of flowering plants

Barfussia is a genus of flowering plants belonging to the family Bromeliaceae.

Its native range is Western South America.

Species:

Image	Scientific name	Distribution
	Barfussia laxissima (Mez) Manzan. & W.Till	Bolivia
	Barfussia moorei (H.Luther) Gouda	Peru
	Barfussia platyrhachis (Mez) Manzan. & W.Till	Bolivia, Colombia, Ecuador, Peru
	Barfussia robusta Gouda	Peru
	Barfussia wagneriana (L.B.Sm.) Manzan. & W.Till	Peru
