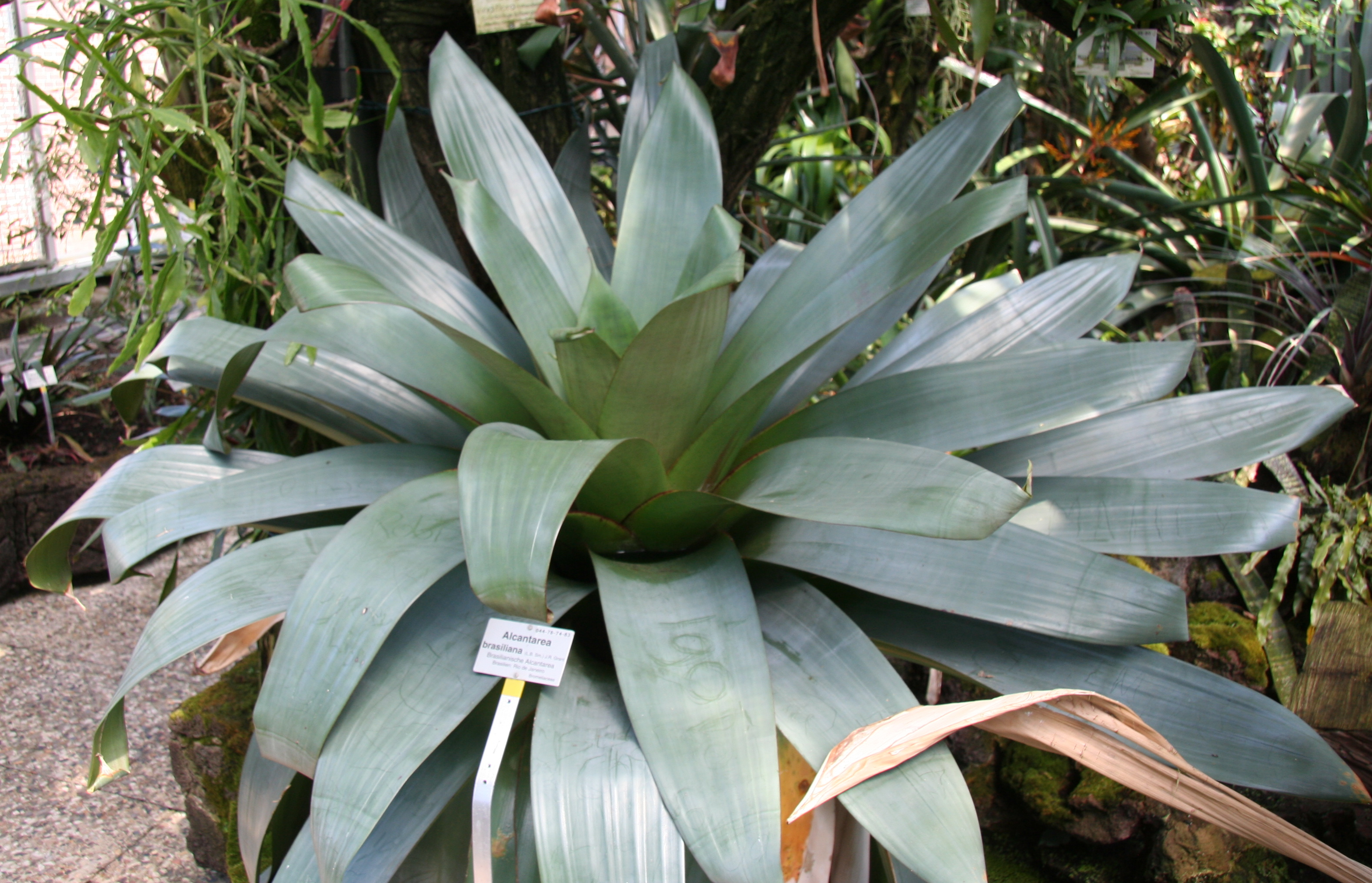

Scientific classification
- Kingdom: Plantae
- Clade: Tracheophytes
- Clade: Angiosperms
- Clade: Monocots
- Clade: Commelinids
- Order: Poales
- Family: Bromeliaceae
- Genus: Alcantarea
- Species: A. brasiliana

Binomial name
- Alcantarea brasiliana (L.B. Smith) J.R. Grant

= Alcantarea brasiliana =

Species of flowering plant

Alcantarea brasiliana is a species in the genus Alcantarea. This species is endemic to Brazil.
