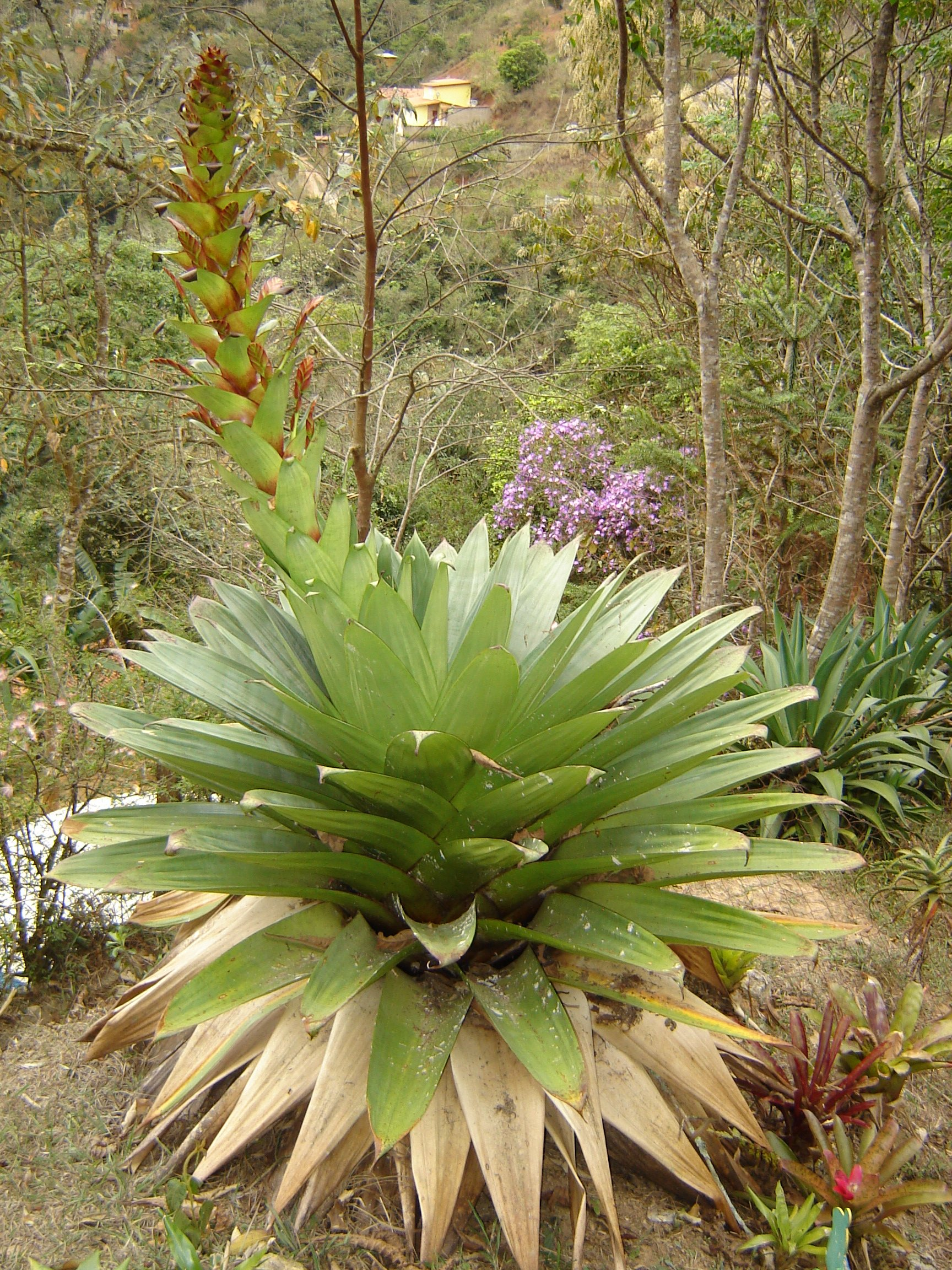
- Flowering Alcantarea imperialis

Scientific classification
- Kingdom: Plantae
- Clade: Embryophytes
- Clade: Tracheophytes
- Clade: Spermatophytes
- Clade: Angiosperms
- Clade: Monocots
- Clade: Commelinids
- Order: Poales
- Family: Bromeliaceae
- Subfamily: Tillandsioideae
- Genus: Alcantarea (É.Morren ex Mez) Harms

Type species
- Alcantarea regina

Species
- See text

= Alcantarea =

Genus of flowering plants

Alcantarea is a genus of flowering plants in the Bromeliaceae family. It is named for Dom Pedro d'Alcântara, second Emperor of Brazil. It is related to the genus Vriesea in the subfamily Tillandsioideae.

== Species ==
Image	Scientific name	Distribution
	Alcantarea benzingii Leme	Brazil.
	Alcantarea brasiliana (L.B. Smith) J.R. Grant	Brazil.
	Alcantarea burle-marxii (Leme) J.R. Grant	Brazil.
	Alcantarea distractila Leme & Paula	Brazil (Minas Gerais)
	Alcantarea duarteana (L.B. Smith) J.R. Grant	Brazil (Minas Gerais: Planalto de Diamantina).
	Alcantarea extensa (L.B. Smith) J.R. Grant	
	Alcantarea farneyi (Martinelli & A. Costa) J.R. Grant	Brazil.
	Alcantarea geniculata (Wawra) J.R. Grant	Brazil.
	Alcantarea glaziouana (Lemaire) Leme	Brazil.
	Alcantarea heloisae J.R. Grant	Brazil.
	Alcantarea imperialis (Carrière) Harms	Brazil.
	Alcantarea lurida Leme	Brazil (Minas Gerais).
	Alcantarea nahoumii (Leme) J.R. Grant	Brazil.
	Alcantarea nevaresii Leme	Brazil.
	Alcantarea odorata (Leme) J.R. Grant	Brazil.
	Alcantarea patriae Versieux & Wanderley	Brazil.
	Alcantarea regina (Vellozo) Harms	Brazil.
	Alcantarea roberto-kautskyi Leme	Brazil.
	Alcantarea tortuosa Versieux & Wanderley	Brazil.
	Alcantarea turgida Versieux & Wanderley	Brazil.
	Alcantarea vinicolor (E. Pereira & Reitz) J.R. Grant	Brazil.
