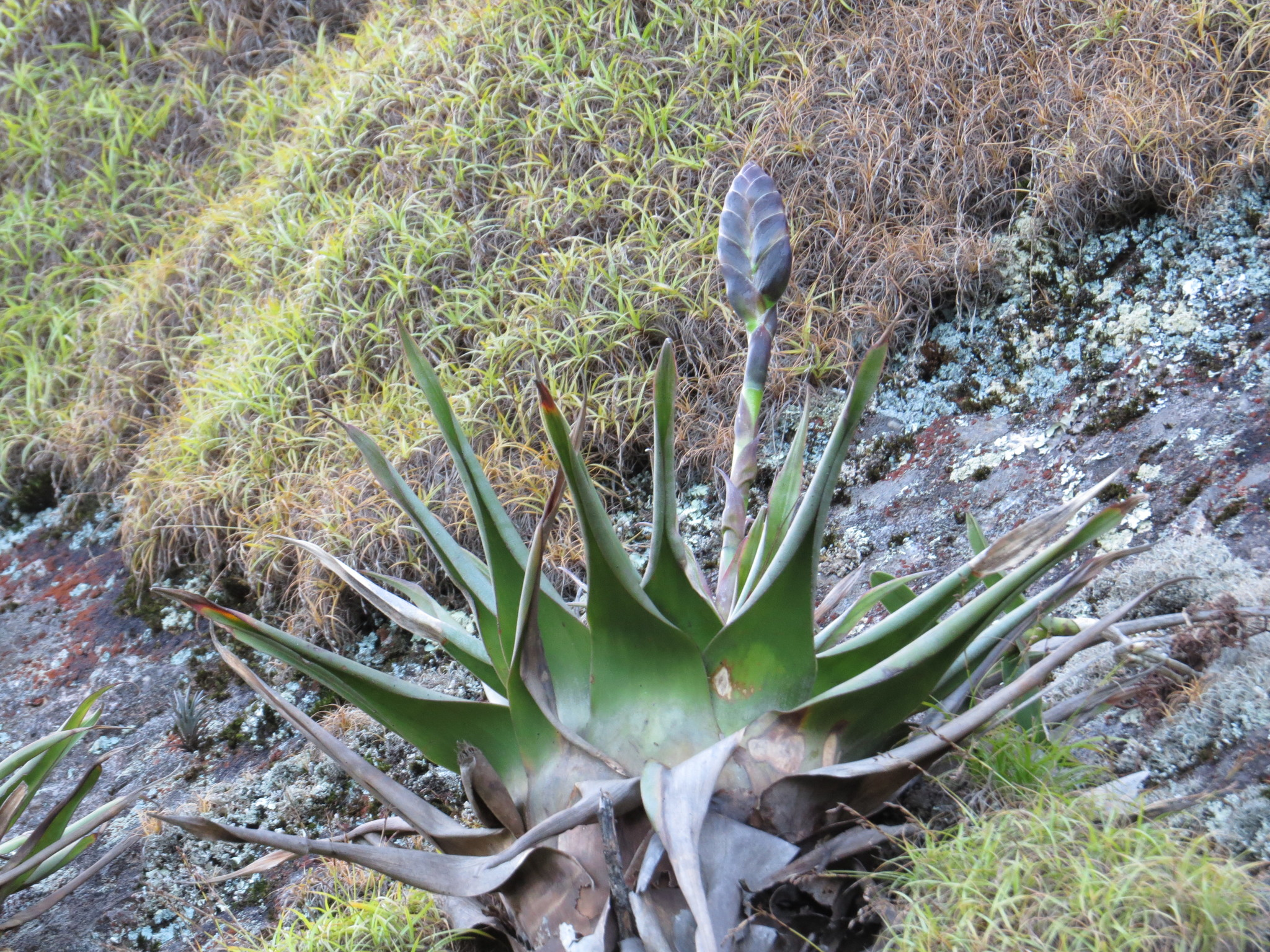
- Stigmatodon goniorachis

Scientific classification
- Kingdom: Plantae
- Clade: Tracheophytes
- Clade: Angiosperms
- Clade: Monocots
- Clade: Commelinids
- Order: Poales
- Family: Bromeliaceae
- Subfamily: Tillandsioideae
- Genus: Stigmatodon; Leme, G.K.Br. & Barfuss

= Stigmatodon =

Genus of epiphytes

Stigmatodon is a genus of plants in the family Bromeliaceae. It is endemic to Brazil.

== Species ==
Species include:

- Stigmatodon amadoi (Leme) Leme, G.K.Br. & Barfuss
- Stigmatodon apparicianus (E.Pereira & Reitz) Leme, G.K.Br. & Barfuss
- Stigmatodon belloi (Leme) Leme, G.K.Br. & Barfuss
- Stigmatodon bifidus (Leme & L.Kollmann) Leme, G.K.Br. & Barfuss
- Stigmatodon brassicoides (Baker) Leme, G.K.Br. & Barfuss
- Stigmatodon costae (B.R.Silva & Leme) Leme, G.K.Br. & Barfuss
- Stigmatodon croceanus (Leme & G.K.Br.) Leme, G.K.Br. & Barfuss
- Stigmatodon euclidianus (Leme & G.K.Br.) Leme, G.K.Br. & Barfuss
- Stigmatodon fontellanus (Leme & G.K.Br.) Leme, G.K.Br. & Barfuss
- Stigmatodon funebris (L.B.Sm.) Leme, G.K.Br. & Barfuss
- Stigmatodon gastinianus (Leme & G.K.Br.) Leme, G.K.Br. & Barfuss
- Stigmatodon goniorachis (Baker) Leme, G.K.Br. & Barfuss
- Stigmatodon harrylutheri (Leme & G.K.Br.) Leme, G.K.Br. & Barfuss
- Stigmatodon magnibracteatus (Leme & L.Kollmann) Leme, G.K.Br. & Barfuss
- Stigmatodon multifoliatus (Leme & G.K.Br.) Leme, G.K.Br. & Barfuss
- Stigmatodon plurifolius (Leme) Leme, G.K.Br. & Barfuss
- Stigmatodon rosulatulus (Leme) Leme, G.K.Br. & Barfuss
- Stigmatodon sanctateresensis (Leme & L.Kollmann) Leme, G.K.Br. & Barfuss
