= Stigmatodon apparicianus =

Scientific classification
- Kingdom: Plantae
- Clade: Tracheophytes
- Clade: Angiosperms
- Clade: Monocots
- Clade: Commelinids
- Order: Poales
- Family: Bromeliaceae
- Genus: Stigmatodon
- Species: S. apparicianus

Binomial name
- Stigmatodon apparicianus (E.Pereira & Reitz) Leme, G.K.Br. & Barfuss

Synonyms
- Vriesea apparicianus E.Pereira & Reitz

Species of flowering plant

Stigmatodon apparicianus, is a species of flowering plant in the family Bromeliaceae. This species is endemic to Brazil.
