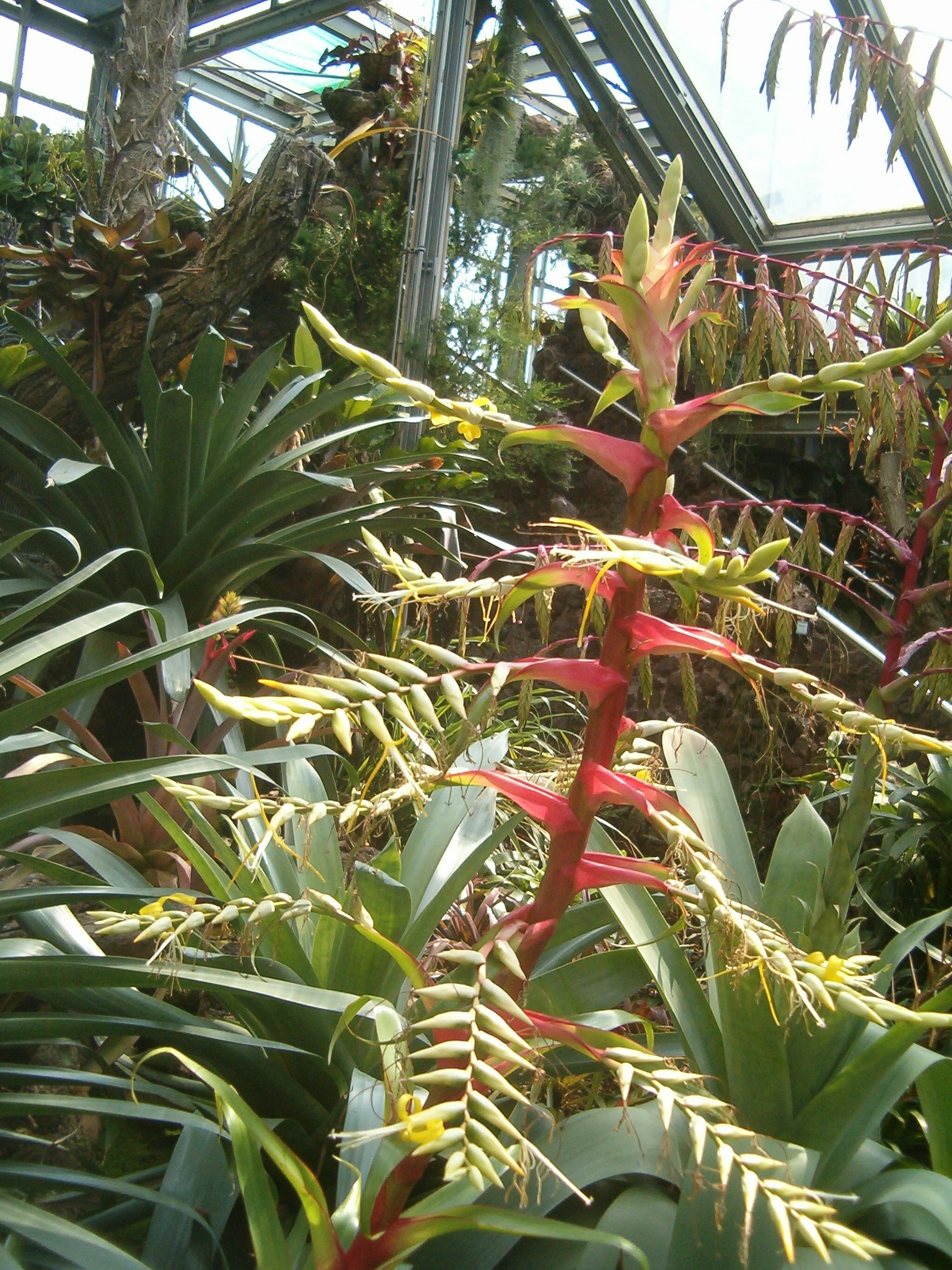

Scientific classification
- Kingdom: Plantae
- Clade: Embryophytes
- Clade: Tracheophytes
- Clade: Spermatophytes
- Clade: Angiosperms
- Clade: Monocots
- Clade: Commelinids
- Order: Poales
- Family: Bromeliaceae
- Genus: Alcantarea
- Species: A. geniculata

Binomial name
- Alcantarea geniculata (Wawra) J.R.Grant

Synonyms
- Platystachys geniculata Wawra; Vriesea geniculata (Wawra) Wawra; Vriesea regina var. glaziouana Wawra

= Alcantarea geniculata =

Species of flowering plant

Alcantarea geniculata is a plant species in the genus Alcantarea. This species is endemic to Brazil.
