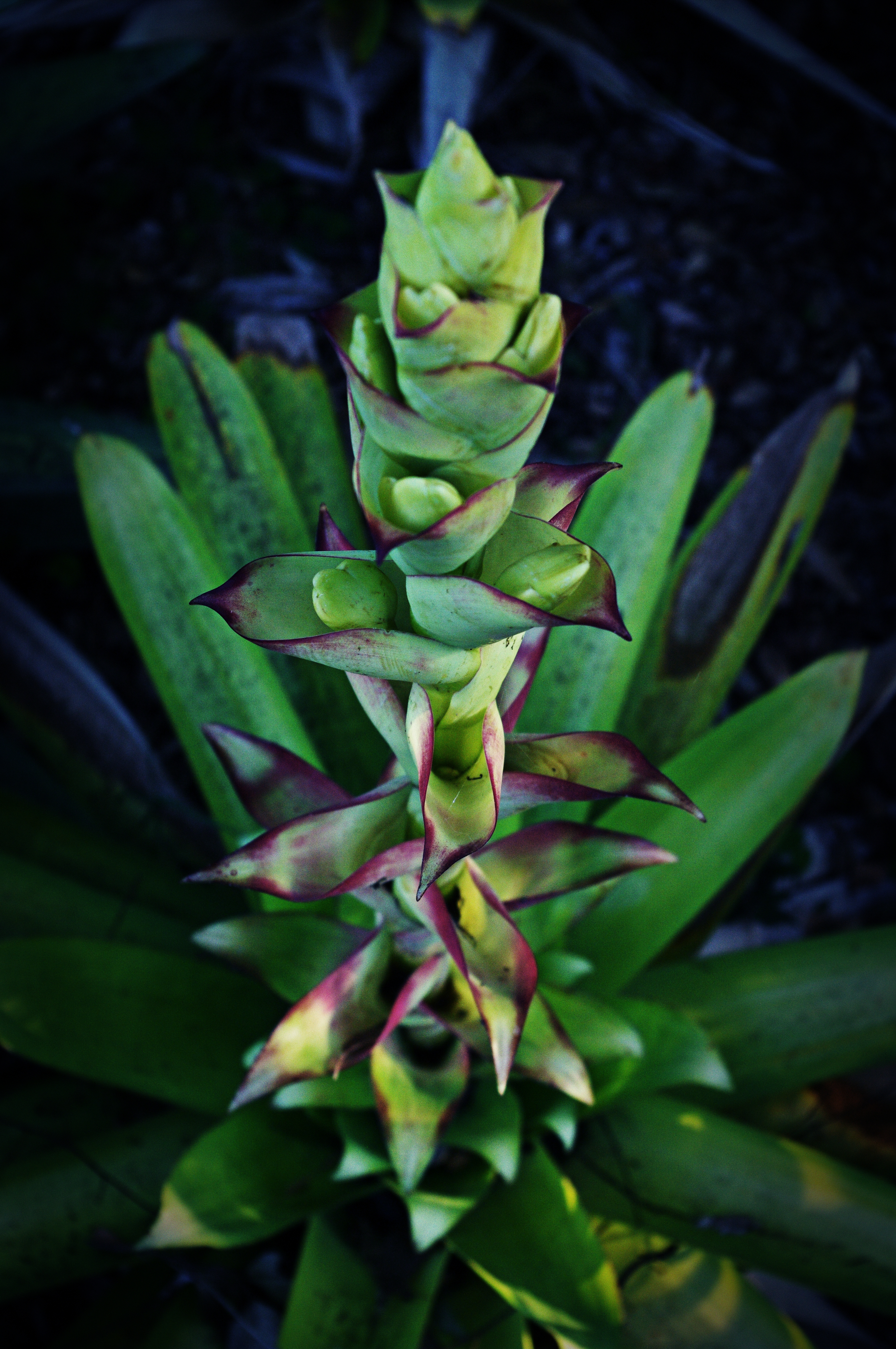

Scientific classification
- Kingdom: Plantae
- Clade: Tracheophytes
- Clade: Angiosperms
- Clade: Monocots
- Clade: Commelinids
- Order: Poales
- Family: Bromeliaceae
- Genus: Alcantarea
- Species: A. nahoumii

Binomial name
- Alcantarea nahoumii (Leme) J.R. Grant

= Alcantarea nahoumii =

Species of flowering plant

Alcantarea nahoumii is a plant species in the genus Alcantarea. This species is native to Brazil.
