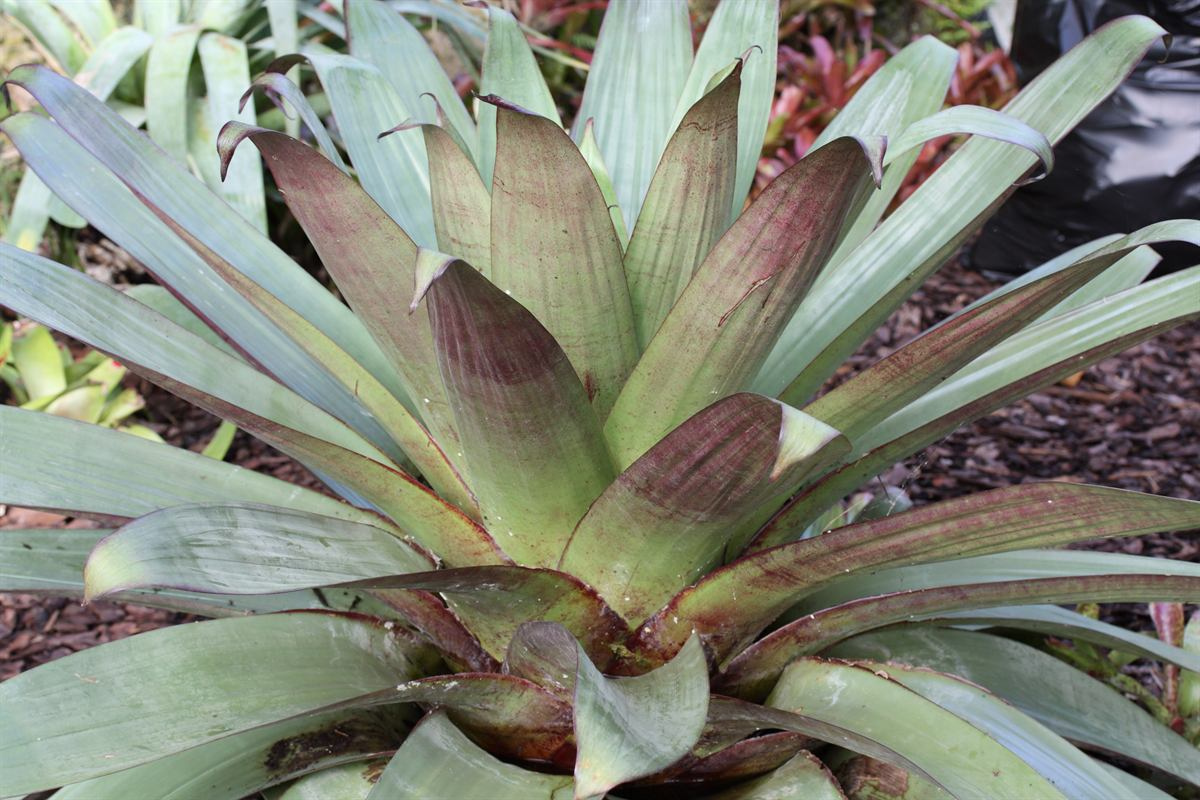

Scientific classification
- Kingdom: Plantae
- Clade: Tracheophytes
- Clade: Angiosperms
- Clade: Monocots
- Clade: Commelinids
- Order: Poales
- Family: Bromeliaceae
- Genus: Alcantarea
- Species: A. imperialis

Binomial name
- Alcantarea imperialis (Carrière) Harms

= Alcantarea imperialis =

Species of flowering plant

Alcantarea imperialis is a robust lithophytic species of bromeliad (family Bromeliaceae) in the genus Alcantarea. This species is endemic to Brazil.

It was first described in 1888 as Vriesea imperialis by Élie-Abel Carrière, who dedicated it to the Emperor Dom Pedro of Brazil with the species epithet, imperialis. It was assigned to the genus, Alcantarea, by Hermann Harms in 1930.

== Description ==
This large terrestrial bromeliad was once classified as Vriesea imperialis but is now recognized as part of the genus Alcantarea. It can be found growing on rocky slopes in the Serra dos Órgãos in Rio de Janeiro. It can tolerate dry conditions and full sunlight. Considered one of the giants of the genus, "its leathery leaves measuring 6 inches in width and 5 feet in length." It will take up to 40 years before producing an imposing red inflorescence that reaches eight or even 3 m (9.8 ft) in height. Its tank will hold up to 30 L (6.6 imp gal; 7.9 US gal) of rainwater.

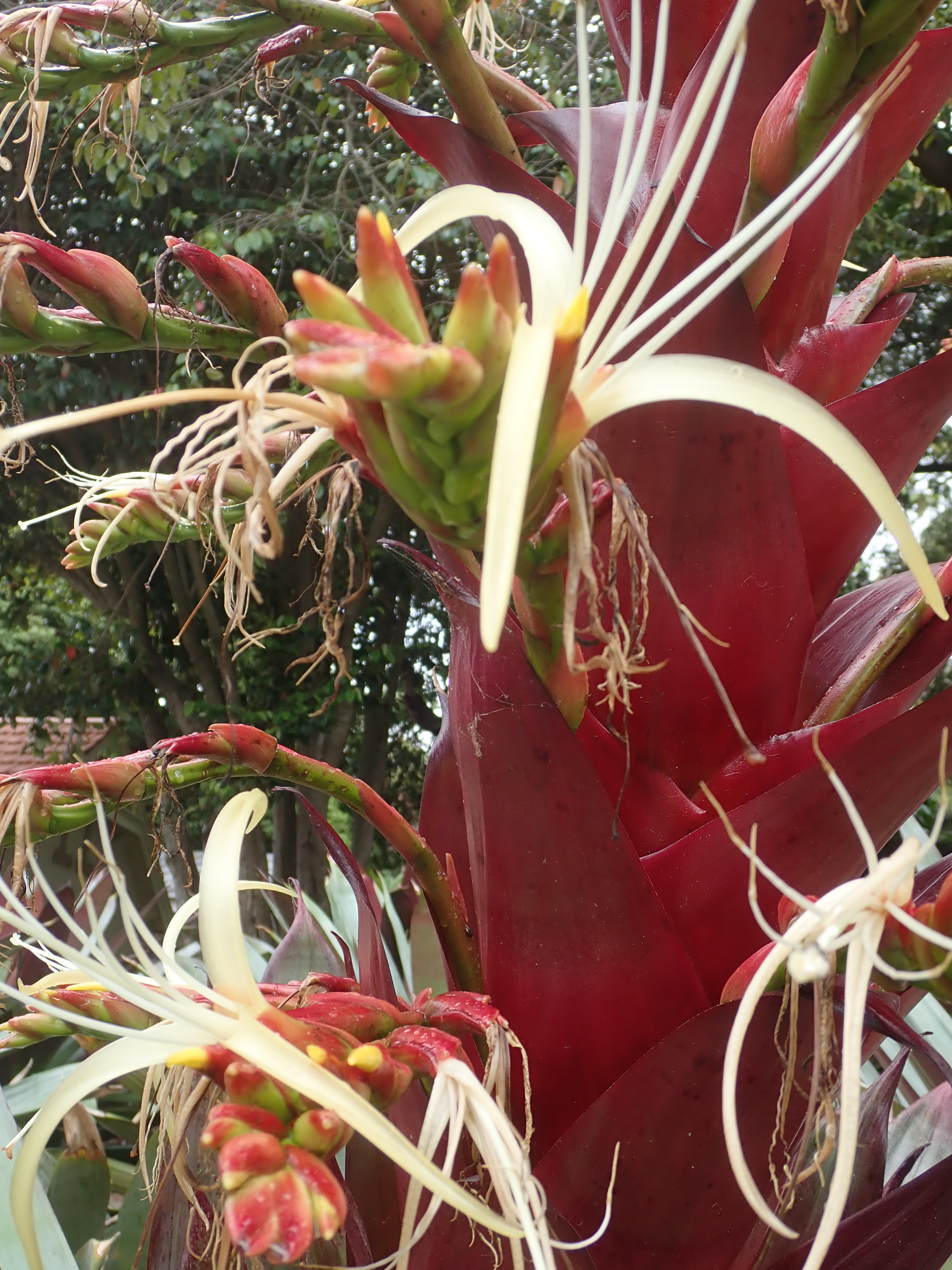
in flower

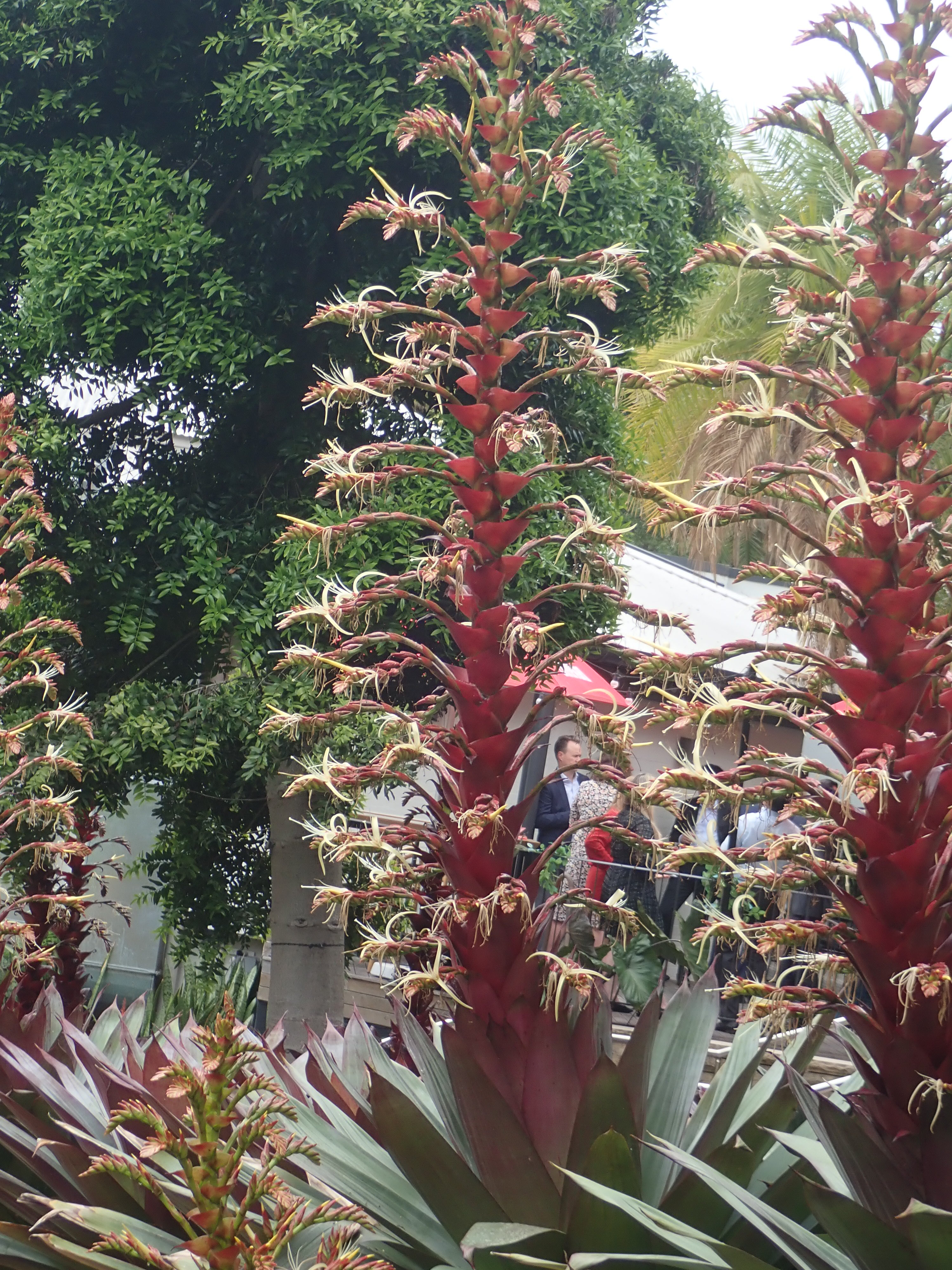

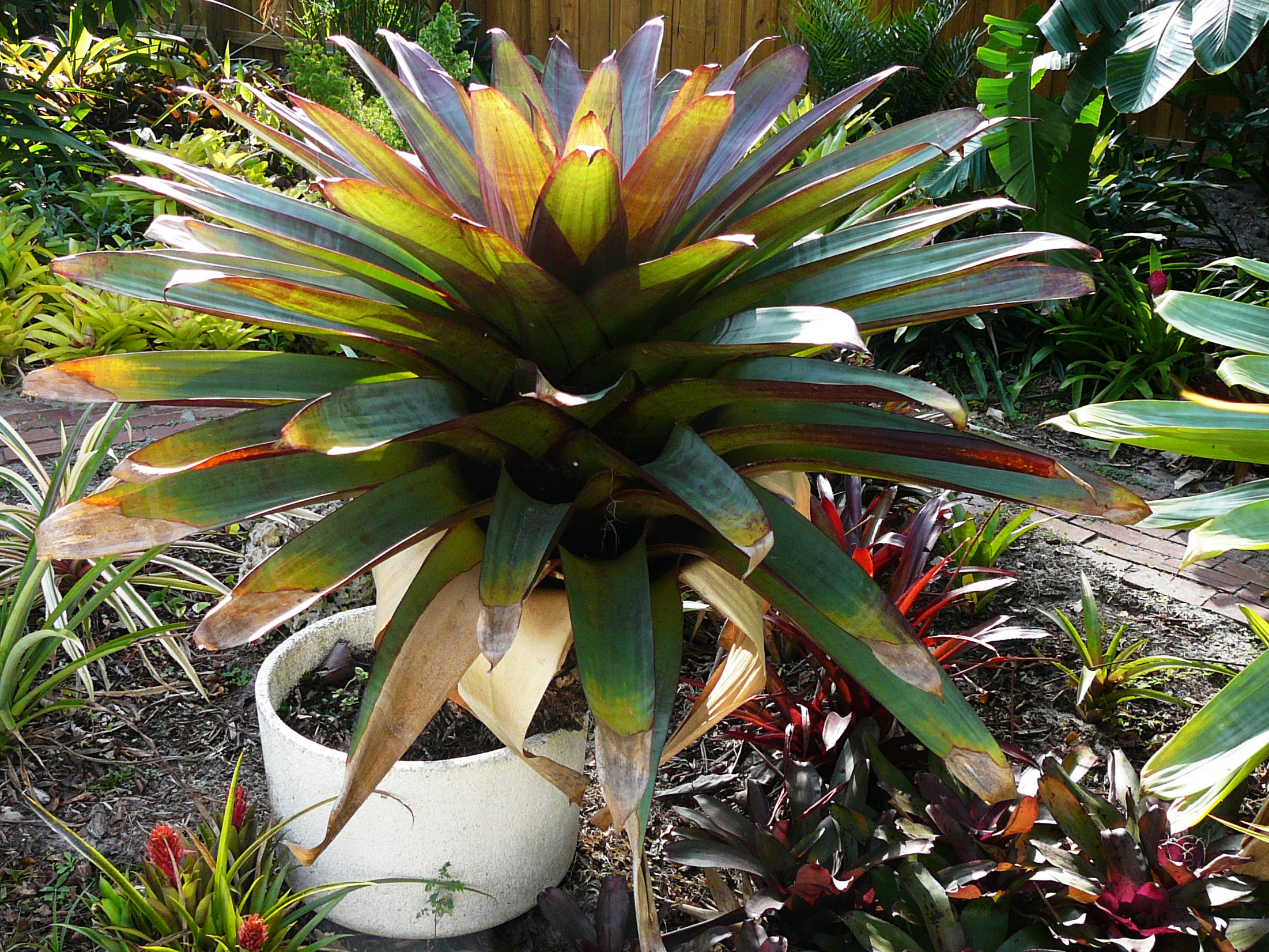
Alcantarea Imperialis - Red Form

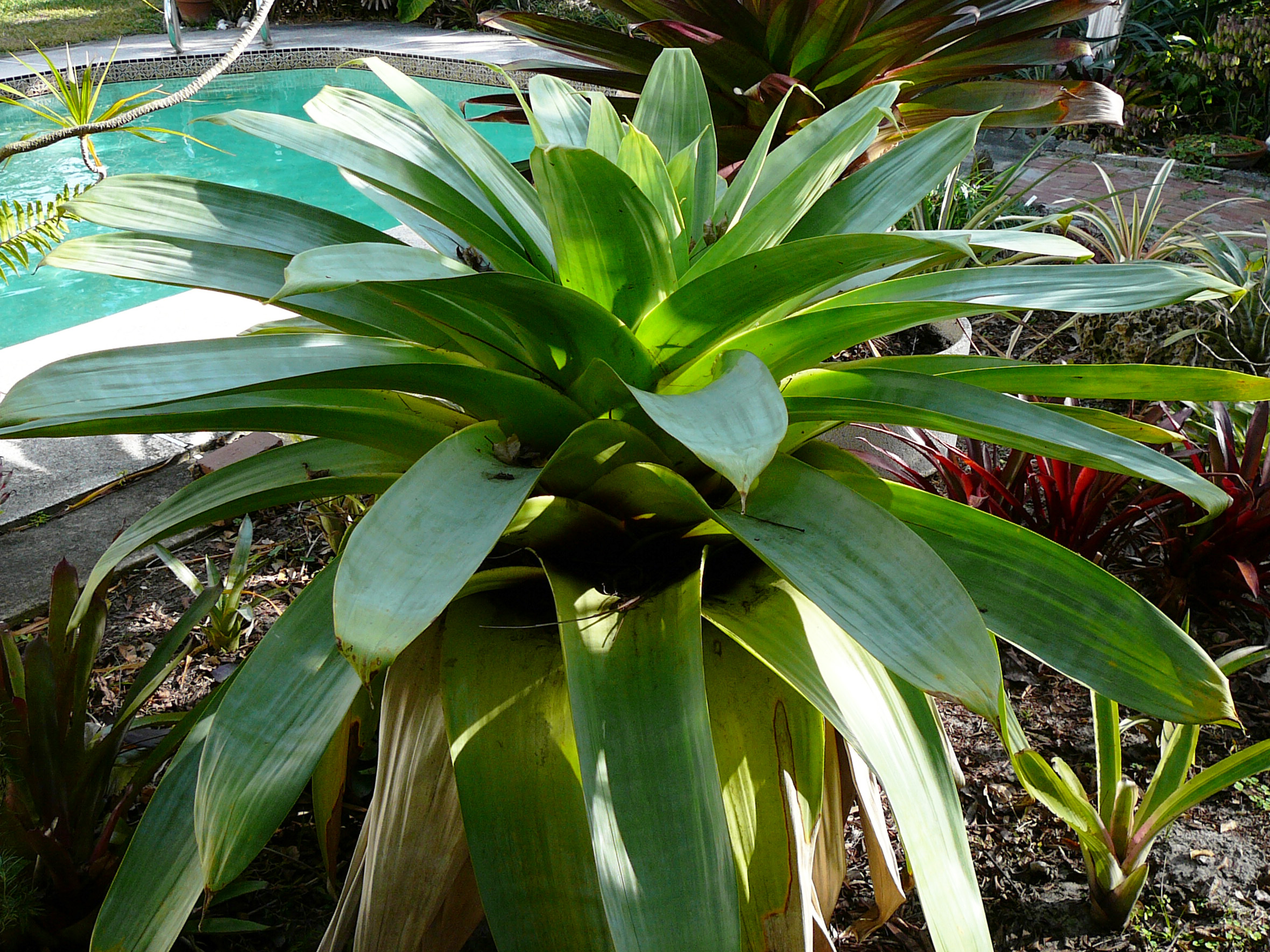
Alcantarea Imperialis - Green Form

== Cultivars ==
- Alcantarea 'Ajax'
- Alcantarea 'Black Cinder'
- Alcantarea 'Gladys'
- Alcantarea 'Helenice'
- Alcantarea 'Purple Skotak'
- Alcantarea 'Silver Plum'
- Alcantarea 'Tarawera'
- Alcantarea 'Totara Orange'
