= Alcantarea roberto-kautskyi =

Scientific classification
- Kingdom: Plantae
- Clade: Tracheophytes
- Clade: Angiosperms
- Clade: Monocots
- Clade: Commelinids
- Order: Poales
- Family: Bromeliaceae
- Genus: Alcantarea
- Species: A. roberto-kautskyi

Binomial name
- Alcantarea roberto-kautskyi Leme

Species of flowering plant

Alcantarea roberto-kautskyi is a plant species in the genus Alcantarea. This species is endemic to Brazil.
