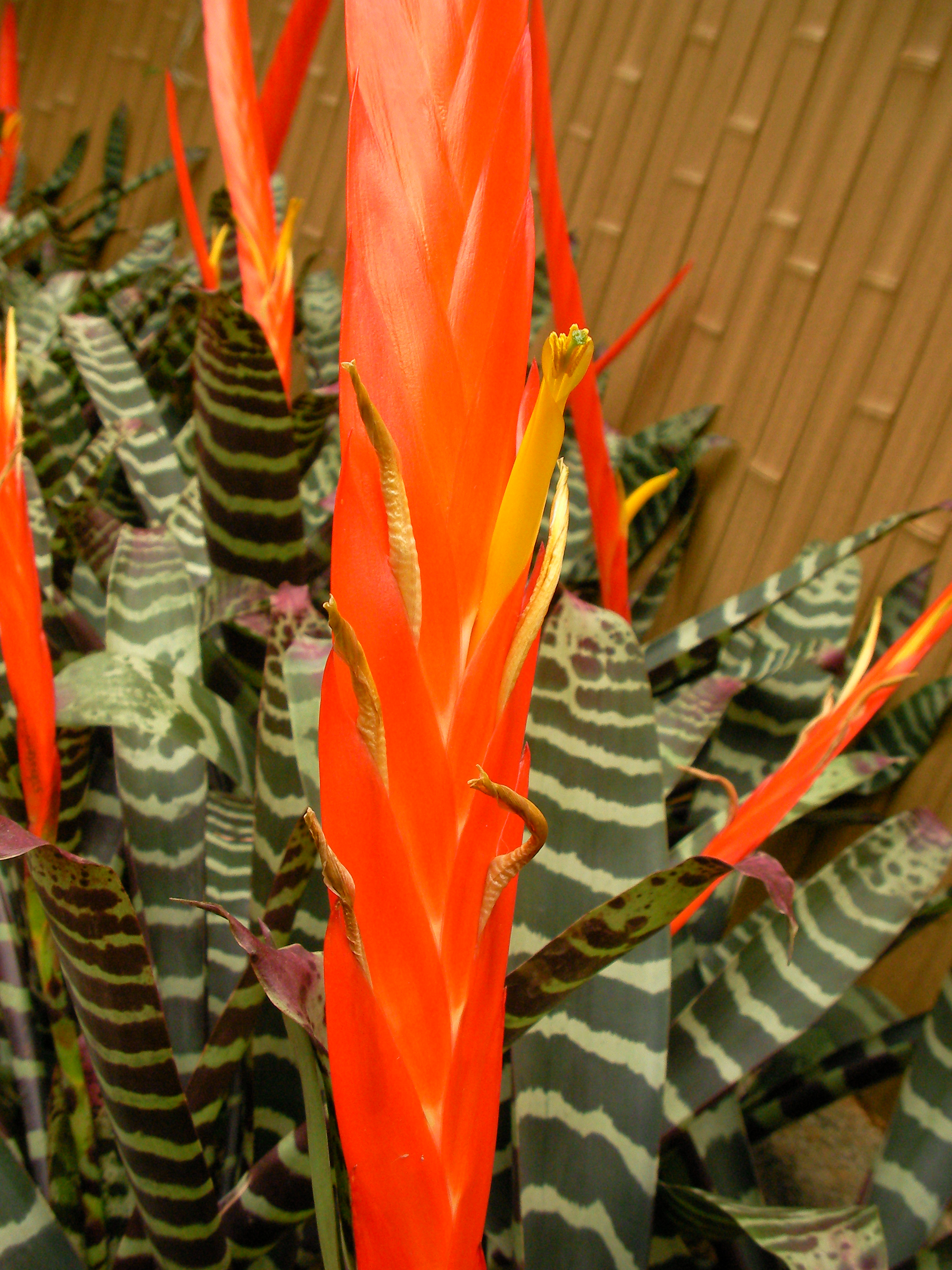
- Lutheria splendens

Scientific classification
- Kingdom: Plantae
- Clade: Tracheophytes
- Clade: Angiosperms
- Clade: Monocots
- Clade: Commelinids
- Order: Poales
- Family: Bromeliaceae
- Subfamily: Tillandsioideae
- Genus: Lutheria; Barfuss & W.Till

= Lutheria =

Genus of epiphytes

Lutheria is a genus of plants in the family Bromeliaceae. It is native to northern South America.

== Species ==
Species include:

- Lutheria bi-beatricis (Morillo) Barfuss & W.Till
- Lutheria glutinosa (Lindl.) Barfuss & W.Till
- Lutheria soderstromii (L.B.Sm.) Barfuss & W.Till
- Lutheria splendens (Brongn.) Barfuss & W.Till
