= Jagrantia =

Scientific classification
- Kingdom: Plantae
- Clade: Tracheophytes
- Clade: Angiosperms
- Clade: Monocots
- Clade: Commelinids
- Order: Poales
- Family: Bromeliaceae
- Genus: Jagrantia; Barfuss & W.Till
- Species: J. monstrum

Binomial name
- Jagrantia monstrum (Mez) Barfuss & W.Till

Genus of plants

Jagrantia is a monotypic genus of flowering plants belonging to the family Bromeliaceae. It only contains one species, Jagrantia monstrum.

Its native range is south-eastern Nicaragua to northern Ecuador. It is found in the countries of Colombia, Costa Rica, Ecuador, Nicaragua and Panama.

The genus name of Jagrantia is in honour of Jason Randall Grant (b. 1969), an American botanist in Neuchâtel, Switzerland and specialist in Bromeliaceae. The Latin specific epithet of monstrum refers to monstrum meaning "a malfunctioning of nature". The word monster is derived from this term. It was first described and published in Phytotaxa Vol.279 on pages 51-52 in 2016.
