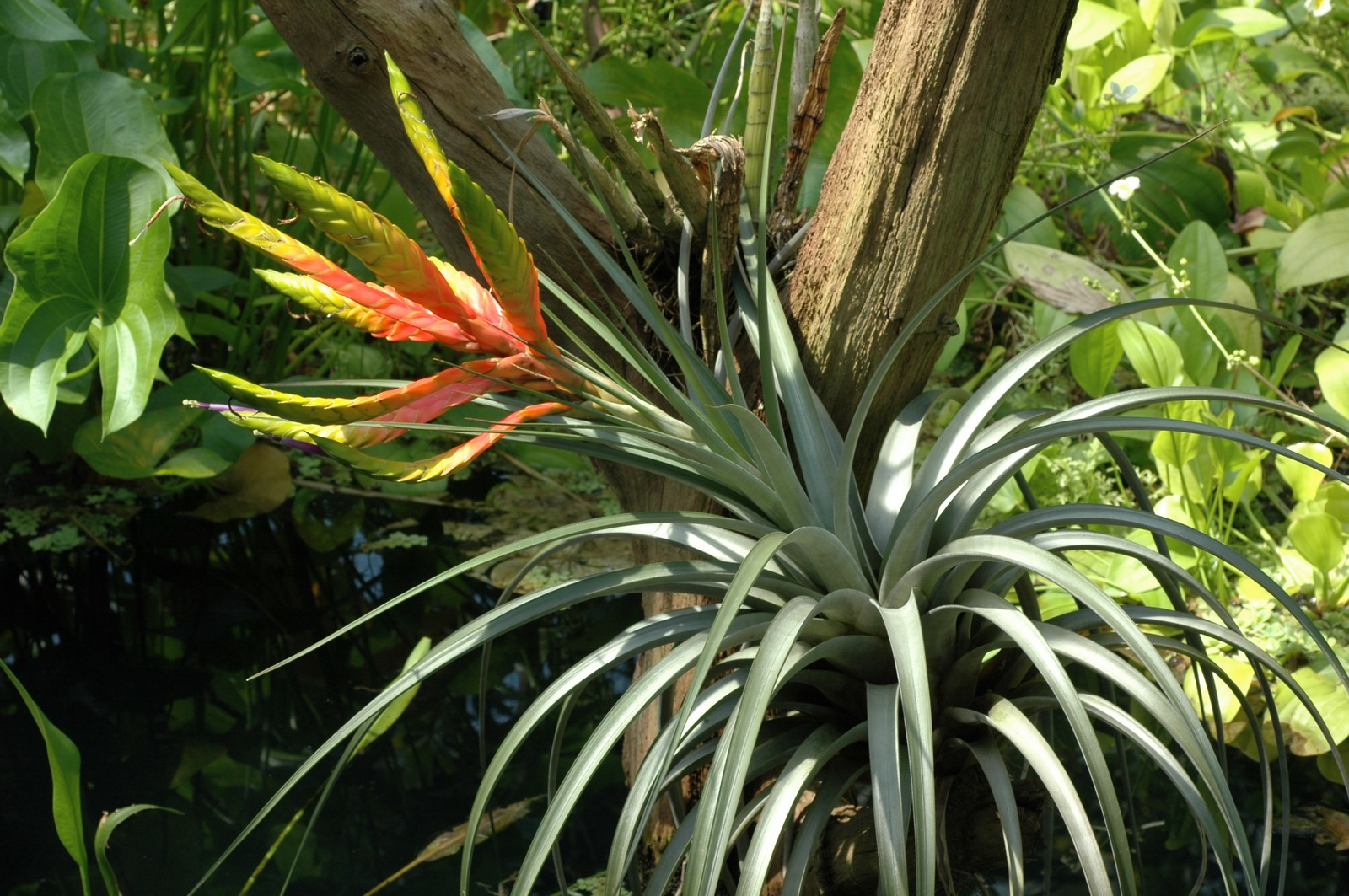
- Tillandsia fasciculata

Scientific classification
- Kingdom: Plantae
- Clade: Tracheophytes
- Clade: Angiosperms
- Clade: Monocots
- Clade: Commelinids
- Order: Poales
- Family: Bromeliaceae
- Subfamily: Tillandsioideae; Harms

Genera
- See text.

= Tillandsioideae =

Subfamily of family Bromeliaceae

Tillandsioideae is a subfamily of plants in the bromeliad family Bromeliaceae. This subfamily contains the greatest number of species (about 1,400). Most are epiphytic or lithophytic, growing in trees or on rocks where they absorb water and nutrients from the air. Spanish moss of the genus Tillandsia is a well-known species. Bromeliads in the genera Guzmania and Vriesea are the more commonly cultivated members of this subfamily.

== Description ==
Nearly all bromeliads have specialized cell groups called trichomes which form scales on the foliage. The trichomes occurring on Tillandsioideae may cover the plants so completely that they appear grey or white, like Spanish moss. In addition to absorbing nutrients, the trichomes may serve to insulate the plant from freezing weather.

Plants in this group have smooth or entire leaf margins, unusual color and markings, with many producing fragrant flowers. All their leaves are spineless (unarmed) and their fruit is a dry capsule containing winged seeds which are usually dispersed by breezes. Feathery seed plumes help them to adhere to a suitable epiphytic surface for germination. This subfamily is probably the most derived with special adaptations for survival in very dry conditions, with many described as xerophytes.

== Taxonomy ==
=== Phylogeny and classification ===
Tillandsioideae is the largest of the subfamilies of the family Bromeliaceae, with upwards of 1,400 species. Molecular phylogenetic studies from 1997 onwards repeatedly showed the monophyly of the subfamily. However, the division of the subfamily into genera has varied considerably. A 1997 monograph used six genera: Catopsis, Glomeropitcairnia, Guzmania, Mezobromelia, Tillandsia and Vriesea. Other genera were later segregated from Tillandsia and Vriesea, of which three, Alcantarea, Racinaea, and Werauhia, gained general acceptance. Molecular phylogenetic studies from 2001 onwards showed that Mezobromelia, Tillandsia and Vriesea in particular were not monophyletic, and that the circumscription of other accepted genera was problematic in relation to these three genera. A major monograph published in 2016 used plastid and nuclear DNA as well as morphological characters to produce a new phylogeny and classification for the subfamily. Their preferred cladogram is shown below.

- Tillandsioideae
  - Non‑core Tillandsioideae
    - Glomeropitcairnieae
      Glomeropitcairnia
    - Catopsideae
      Catopsis
  - Core Tillandsioideae
    - Vrieseeae
      - Vrieseinae
        - Alcantarea
        - - Stigmatodon
          - Vriesea s.s.
      - Cipuropsidinae
        - - Jagrantia
          - Lutheria
          - Werauhia
        - - Goudaea
          - - Zizkaea
            - Cipuropsis s.l.
              - Josemania
              - Cipuropsis-Mezobromelia complex
    - Tillandsieae
      - Gregbrownia
      - - Guzmania
        - - Pseudalcantarea s.s.
          - - Barfussia
            - - Lemeltonia
              - - Wallisia
                - Racinaea
          - Tillandsia

The 2016 study was unable to fully resolve the two genera Cipuropsis and Mezobromelia because the type species of Cipuropsis, Cipuropsis subandina, was not available for study. In 2017, Gouda added a new species to Cipuropsis (Cipuropsis asmussii) and clarified the distinction between Cipuropsis and Mezobromelia, leaving the former with three species. As of November 2022, the Encyclopaedia of Bromeliads accepted both genera, as well as the closely related Josemania, whereas Plants of the World Online treated all three in the single broadly defined genus Cipuropsis – marked as Cipuropsis s.l. on the cladogram above. Waltillia was not included in the 2016 study as a separate genus, but is accepted by both the Encyclopaedia of Bromeliads and Plants of the World Online.

The classification produced by the 2016 monograph uses four tribes, Catopsideae, Glomeropitcairnieae, Tillandsieae and Vrieseeae, the last of which is divided into two subtribes, Cipuropsidinae and Vrieseinae.

=== Genera ===
Genera placed in the subfamily as of October 2022 by the Encyclopaedia of Bromeliads are listed below. Plants of the World Online did not accept Josemania and Mezobromelia, sinking them into Cipuropsis. Tribe and subtribe placements are from the 2016 monograph and the Encyclopaedia of Bromeliads.

Image	Genus	Tribe and subtribe
	Alcantarea (E.Morren ex Mez) Harms.	Vrieseeae: Vrieseinae
	Barfussia Manzan. & W.Till	Tillandsieae
	Catopsis Griseb.	Catopsideae
	Cipuropsis Ule	Vrieseeae: Cipuropsidinae
	Glomeropitcairnia	Glomeropitcairnieae
	Goudaea W.Till & Barfuss	Vrieseeae: Cipuropsidinae
	Gregbrownia W.Till & Barfuss	Tillandsieae
	Guzmania Ruiz & Pav.	Tillandsieae
	x Guzlandsia Gouda (Guzmania × Tillandsia)	Tillandsieae
	Jagrantia Barfuss & W.Till	Vrieseeae: Cipuropsidinae
	Josemania W.Till & Barfuss	Vrieseeae: Cipuropsidinae
	Lemeltonia Barfuss & W.Till	Tillandsieae
	Lutheria Barfuss & W.Till	Vrieseeae: Cipuropsidinae
	Mezobromelia L.B.Smith	Vrieseeae: Cipuropsidinae
	Pseudalcantarea (Mez) Pinzón & Barfuss	Tillandsieae
	Racinaea	Tillandsieae
	Stigmatodon Leme, G.K.Br. & Barfuss	Vrieseeae: Vrieseinae
	Tillandsia L.	Tillandsieae
	Vriesea Lindl.	Vrieseeae: Vrieseinae
	Wallisia (Regel) É.Morren	Tillandsieae
	Waltillia Leme, Barfuss & Halbritter	Vrieseeae: Vrieseinae
	Werauhia J.R.Grant	Vrieseeae: Cipuropsidinae
	Zizkaea W.Till & Barfuss	Vrieseeae: Cipuropsidinae
