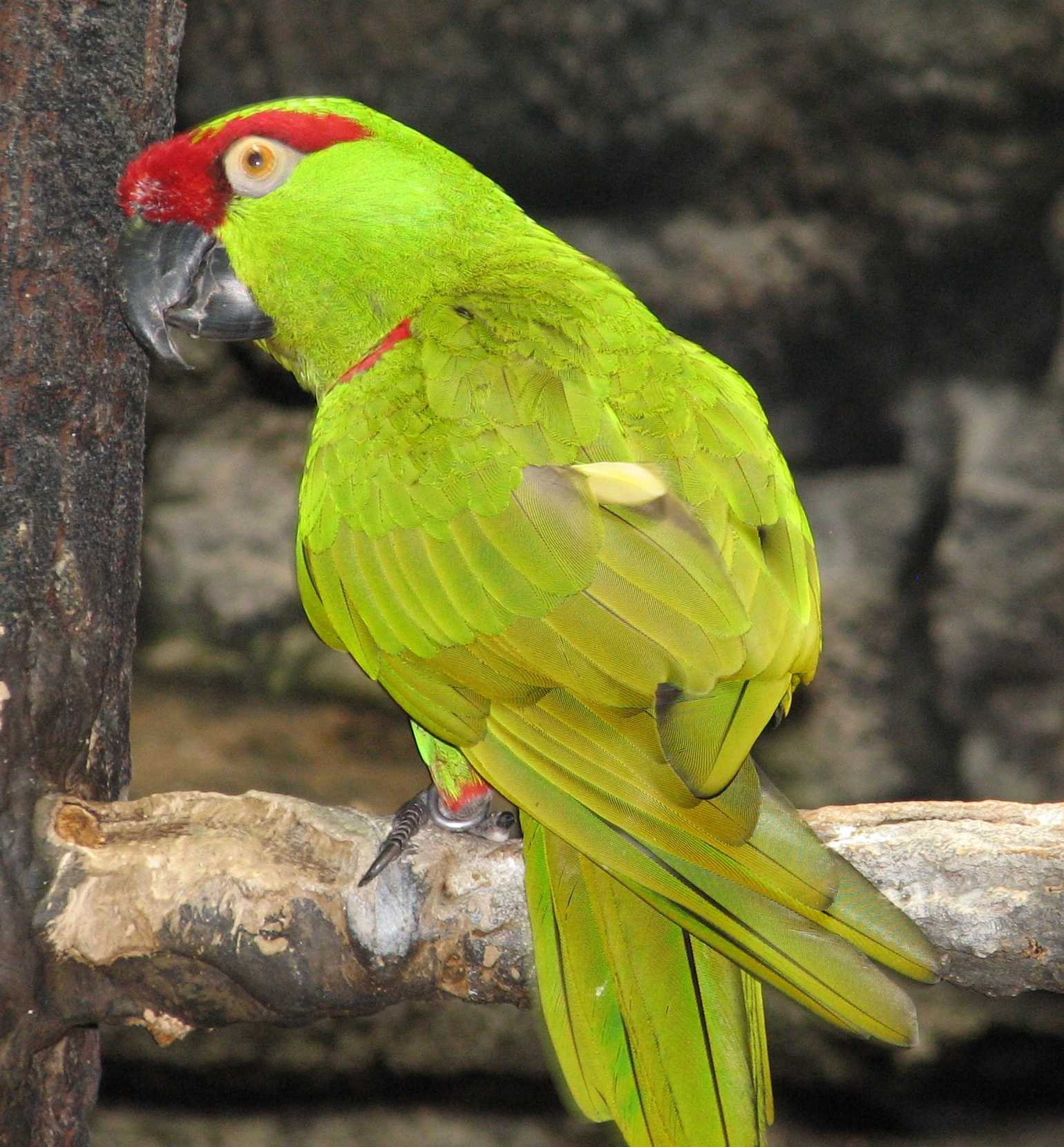
- Adult thick-billed parrot, Rhynchopsitta pachyrhyncha at Cincinnati Zoo, US

Scientific classification
- Kingdom: Animalia
- Phylum: Chordata
- Class: Aves
- Order: Psittaciformes
- Family: Psittacidae
- Tribe: Arini
- Genus: Rhynchopsitta; Bonaparte, 1854

Type species
- Rhynchopsitta pachyrhyncha Swainson, 1827

Species
- Rhynchopsitta pachyrhyncha (Swainson, 1827); Rhynchopsitta terrisi Moore, RT, 1947 †Rhynchopsitta phillipsi Rea, 1997

= Rhynchopsitta =

Thick-billed parrot

Genus of birds

The thick-billed parrots are stocky brilliant green Neotropical parrots with heavy black beaks of genus Rhynchopsitta of thick billed macaw-like parrots. The genus comprises two extant species, the thick-billed parrot and the maroon-fronted parrot, as well as an extinct species from the Late Pleistocene in Mexico. The two extant taxa were formerly considered conspecific; they have become rare and are restricted to a few small areas in northern Mexico. The range of the thick-billed parrot formerly extended into the southwestern United States; attempts at reintroduction have been unsuccessful so far.

== Description ==
The two living species have a similar overall appearance, the principal differences lying in their relative sizes and brightness of coloration. Both are mainly green, with red or maroon markings on the forehead, forecrown, broad superciliary stripe, and feathers on the bend of the wing, the carpal edge and the thighs. Their eye-rings are yellow, with the feet and beak dark gray to black. Juveniles have a pale beak fading to gray at the base, whitish eye-rings, and a red brow, but lack the dark red stripes over the eye-rings. The maroon-fronted parrot is generally dark green with maroon-brown head markings and is between 40 cm (16 in) and 45 cm (18 in) in length while the thick-billed parrot is about 38 cm (15 in) long with brighter colors.

== Taxonomy ==
The genus was described by French naturalist Charles Lucien Bonaparte; the name is derived from the Ancient Greek terms rhynchos "beak", and psitta "parrot". The two extant taxa were considered subspecies of a single species, before being split.

- Rhynchopsitta Bonaparte, 1854
  - Rhynchopsitta pachyrhyncha (Swainson, 1827) (thick-billed parrot)
  - Rhynchopsitta terrisi Moore, 1947 (maroon-fronted parrot)
  - †Rhynchopsitta phillipsi Rea, 1997 - extinct

Rhynchopsitta phillipsi, a larger prehistoric relative, was described from Late Pleistocene fossils found in Nuevo León, Mexico. It was not an ancestor to the living species, as bones of them were also found at San Josecito Cave when R. phillipsi's remains were recovered. The prehistoric species had a distinct bill shape and may have occurred sympatrically with the maroon-fronted parrot in the northern Sierra Madre Oriental. Possibly its bill was adapted to feeding on a species of pine which disappeared due to climate change at the end of the last ice age, driving it to extinction.

== Ecology ==
Both extant species are found at heights of between 1500 and 3000 m asl in Mexico in isolated island-like forest habitats in the Sierra Madre, and are sometimes called snow parrots because of their high-altitude habitat. They show seasonal migration patterns, generally breeding in the northern parts of their range and overwintering in the southern. The thick-billed parrot nests in tree cavities, while the maroon-fronted parrot is a cliff cavity breeder. The parrots roost at night in large flocks, while they forage during the day in smaller flocks over a large area. They feed primarily on pine seeds, which they extract by systematically stripping the cones from the base to the top. They also eat other seeds such as acorns, as well as softer foods such as fruits, bark, nectar, other vegetable matter, and insects.

== Status ==
Both the thick-billed and the maroon-fronted parrot are classified as endangered by the International Union for Conservation of Nature. They are listed on CITES Appendix I, trade forbidden except for legitimate conservation, scientific or educational purposes. They are also protected under Mexican General Wildlife Law (2008), import and export prohibited. The populations of both species have declined primarily due to habitat degradation, and now both are restricted to a few small areas in the mountains of northern Mexico. The range of the thick-billed parrot formerly extended into Arizona and New Mexico. Attempts are being made to breed the species in captivity for release in their former range. An earlier attempt in the 1980s and 1990s to reintroduce thick-billed parrots to Arizona failed because the captive-bred birds had not learned to avoid their natural and human predators, but new plans for the reintroduction of this species include the use of wild-caught individuals.

== Species ==
Genus Rhynchopsitta – two species
Common name	Scientific name and subspecies	Range	Size and ecology	IUCN status and estimated population
Thick-billed parrot	Rhynchopsitta pachyrhyncha (Swainson, 1827)	Sierra Madre Occidental in Mexico (and reintroduced to the U.S.)	Size: A mostly green medium-sized parrot, 38 cm (15 in) long. Adults have a large black bill. a red brow, amber irises, red at the bend of the wings, and red thighs. Juveniles have brown irises and a pale peak. The under-wings and tail appear blackish. Habitat: Diet:	EN
Maroon-fronted parrot	Rhynchopsitta terrisi R.T. Moore, 1947	Sierra Madre Oriental in Mexico	Size: A large mostly green parrot about 40 cm (16 in) to 45 cm (18 in) long. The adults have a dark maroon brow which extends over the rim of bare yellow skin that surrounds the eyes. They have a brighter red at the bend of the wing. The tail is long and pointed. The underside of the wings are blackish. Habitat: Diet:	EN

=== Fossils ===
Species
Common and binomial names	Image	Description	Range
†Rhynchopsitta phillipsi		Large parrot with a distinct bill shape	Late Pleistocene fossils of the extinct parrot have been found in Mexico.
