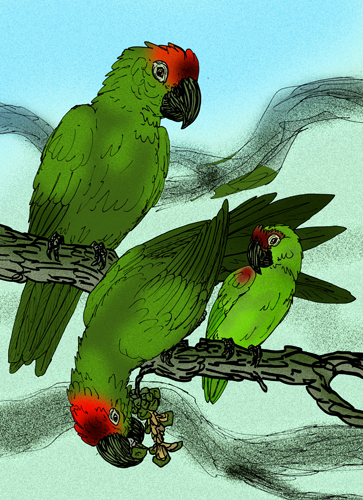
- R. phillipsi compared to the maroon-fronted parrot

Scientific classification
- Kingdom: Animalia
- Phylum: Chordata
- Class: Aves
- Order: Psittaciformes
- Family: Psittacidae
- Genus: Rhynchopsitta
- Species: R. phillipsi

Binomial name
- Rhynchopsitta phillipsi Rea, 1997

= Rhynchopsitta phillipsi =

Rhynchopsitta phillipsi Temporal range: Late Pleistocene

Extinct species of thick-billed parrot

Rhynchopsitta phillipsi is an extinct species of thick-billed parrot. It was described in 1997 from Late Pleistocene cave deposits from Nuevo León in northeastern Mexico. The specific epithet honours American ornithologist Allan Robert Phillips.
