= Borestone Mountain Poetry Awards =

Annual series of poetry anthologies

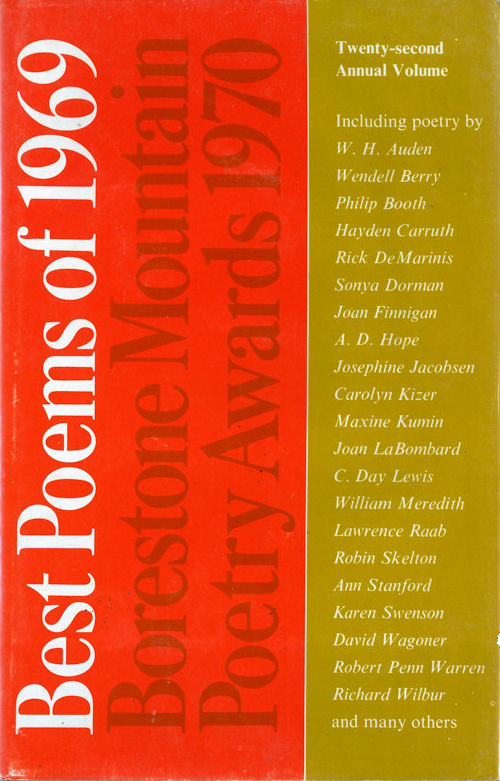
Best Poems of 1969: Borestone Mountain Poetry Awards 1970

The Borestone Mountain Poetry Awards was an annual series of poetry anthologies first published in 1949. The poems were selected from those published in a given year in English-language magazines and books; in each volume, individual poems were designated as first, second, or third place in a poetry contest. Additionally, the first ten volumes printed poems that were selected in a competition for undergraduate college students. Twenty-nine volumes were published through 1977.

The founder of the series, and its editor-in-chief for the first ten volumes, was Robert Thomas Moore. Moore, a businessman and an independent ornithologist, owned a large preserve on Borestone Mountain, and in 1953 he wrote that the series "was founded on Borestone Mountain, Maine, in 1946 and this location is still its permanent headquarters." Moore had established a charitable foundation that underwrote the expenses of administering the Poetry Awards and publishing the annual anthology. Following Moore's death in 1958, Lionel Stevenson carried on as the chairman of the editorial board until his own death in 1973.

The first four volumes were titled in the style, Poetry Awards - 1949: A Compilation of Original Poetry Published in Magazines of the English-speaking World in 1948. Beginning with the 1953 volume, they were titled in the style Borestone Mountain Poetry Awards 1953: A Compilation ... in order to "prevent confusion with 'awards' by other organizations". The titling was changed for the last time in 1957, reading Best Poems of 1956: Borestone Mountain Poetry Awards 1957: A Compilation ....

The poets and publishers whose poems were selected for the anthologies often note this selection as a distinction, typically as a "Borestone Mountain Poetry Award". The curriculum vitae of Richard Wilbur, Poet Laureate of the United States in 1987, notes that his poem "Advice to a Prophet" won first place in the 1959 volume. Similarly, Mona Van Duyn, Poet Laureate in 1992, is noted as having won first prize in the 1968 volume.

== See also ==
- Pushcart Prize
- The Best American Poetry
