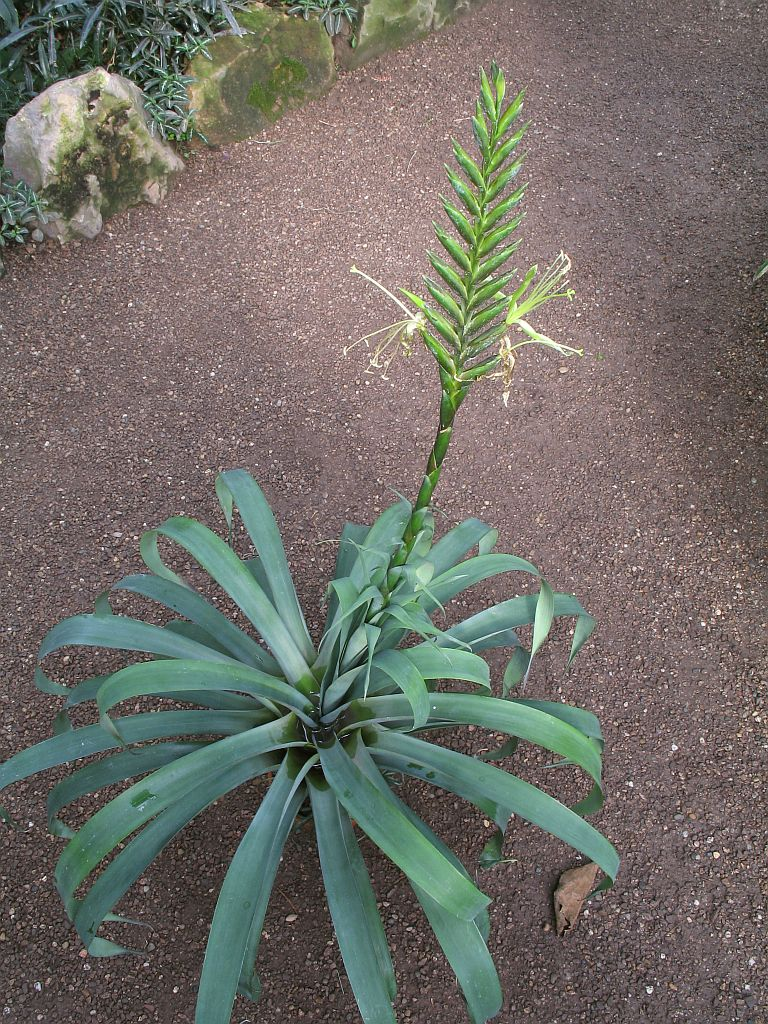

Scientific classification
- Kingdom: Plantae
- Clade: Tracheophytes
- Clade: Angiosperms
- Clade: Monocots
- Clade: Commelinids
- Order: Poales
- Family: Bromeliaceae
- Subfamily: Tillandsioideae
- Genus: Pseudalcantarea
- Species: P. viridiflora

Binomial name
- Pseudalcantarea viridiflora (Beer) Pinzón & Barfuss

Synonyms
- Platystachys viridiflora Beer; Tillandsia viridiflora (Beer) Baker; Tillandsia longiflora Sessé & Moc.; Tillandsia orizabensis Baker

= Pseudalcantarea viridiflora =

Species of epiphyte

Pseudalcantarea viridiflora is a species of flowering plant in the family Bromeliaceae, native to Mexico and Central America (Guatemala, Honduras and Nicaragua). It was first described by Johann Georg Beer (as Platystachys viridiflora) in 1856.

As of October 2022, the Encyclopaedia of Bromeliads regarded Vriesea billbergiae Lem. and Tillandsia billbergiae (Lem.) Baker as synonyms of Pseudalcantarea viridiflora, whereas Plants of the World Online regarded them as unplaced.
