= Rio Grande Glaze Ware =

Historic ceramic ware produced by the Puebloan people of New Mexico

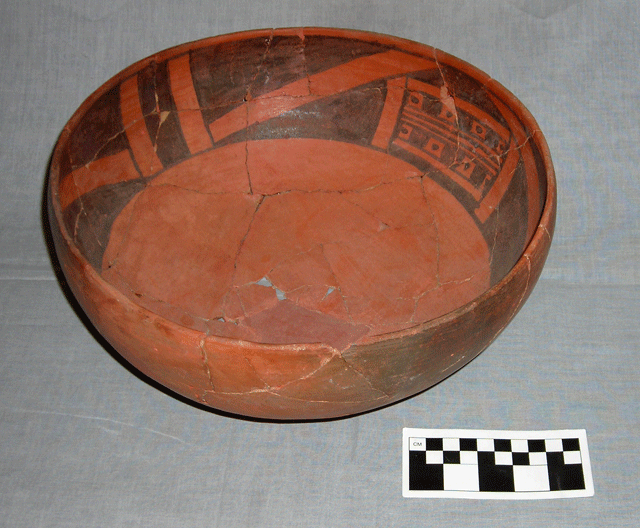
Agua Fria Glaze-on-red bowl

Rio Grande Glaze Ware is a late prehistoric and historic pottery tradition of the Puebloan peoples of New Mexico. The tradition involved painting pots with black paint made with lead ore; as the pots were fired the black paint fused and sometimes ran. The tradition lasted from AD 1315 to 1700. Rio Grande Glaze Ware was made or used in a number of villages from the Santa Fe area to the north end of Elephant Butte Reservoir, and from the valley of the Rio Puerco east to the upper Pecos River Valley.

Archaeologists divide Rio Grande Glaze Ware into arbitrary types with much shorter life spans, primarily to help them date sites. Individual potsherds are assigned to types based on a combination of attributes, beginning with vessel rim profiles and proceeding to painted designs or vice versa.

== Overview and cautions ==
Rio Grande Glaze Ware was first made about AD 1315 (based on tree-ring dating at Tijeras Pueblo). It partly displaced an earlier tradition of black-on-white pottery and was inspired by the White Mountain Red Ware tradition (Carlson 1970) centered on the upper Little Colorado drainage of eastern Arizona and western New Mexico. The apparent ancestral type for Rio Grande Glaze Ware, Los Padillas Polychrome, was a local variant on a White Mountain Red Ware type, Heshotauthla Polychrome (Wilson 2005:43). Los Padillas is found at sites dominated by black-on-white decorated pottery (Mera 1935:33), a pattern predating the glazeware tradition, and Wilson (2005:43) dates Los Padillas from AD 1175 to 1300. Habicht-Mauche (1993, Table 2) dates it from AD 1300 to 1350, however. The type is sometimes called Los Padillas Glaze Polychrome.

Rio Grande Glaze Ware was fired in an oxygen rich atmosphere. The lead-based pigment yielded a black glazing paint despite the presence of oxygen, while iron-based, non-glazing pigment yielded a matte red paint. Red design elements were most often outlined in black. On most pots, background colors ranged from red to olive to yellow, achieved with clay slips containing iron. A white slip was sometimes achieved by using slip clay imported from the Acoma-Zuni region to the west.

Rio Grande Glaze Ware was no longer made after 1700, because the Spanish cut off Pueblo access to the lead ore used in making the glaze paint (Wilson 1995:10). The Pueblos continued to make polychrome pottery but used all matte paints (Harlow 1973), as they do today.

The ware was made in the Rio Grande Valley and adjacent valleys, from roughly Santa Fe south to the north end of Elephant Butte Reservoir, and from the Rio Puerco east and northeast to the upper Pecos River. Unlike Old World glazed pottery and its derivatives, Rio Grande Glaze Ware used the glaze material as part of a decorative scheme, never to coat and waterproof the entire vessel.

Spielmann (1998) argues that the new pottery was part of changing religious practices among the New Mexico Pueblos, and specifically that "large glaze ware bowls were used... for communal feasting, with each household contributing to the feast. The smaller white ware bowls continued to function as vessels for domestic food consumption. During the fifteenth century, white ware bowls were replaced by a smaller form of the Rio Grande glaze ware bowl, and thus glaze ware bowls came to be used in both ceremonial feasting (large size bowl) and domestic food consumption (small size bowl)" (Spielmann 1998:258).

Archaeologists divide Rio Grande Glaze Ware into a number of types, primarily to estimate the age of a site (based on what pottery types were found there). In this article the first approach to the named types begins with rim profiles. It is followed by a breakdown that begins with paint styles. Both approaches can be useful in understanding why a specific piece of pottery was assigned to a specific type. What follows is not an exhaustive typology (those can be found in the references provided). Rather, it is just extensive enough to allow non-specialists to understand the existing named distinctions.

== Approach based on rims ==
The most time-sensitive attribute of Rio Grande Glaze Ware pottery is the rim profiles of bowls, so most archaeologists sort potsherds beginning with the rims. In doing so they refer to Glaze A through Glaze F pottery, A rims being the earliest and F rims being the latest (Hawley 1950; Wilson 2005). This letter-based key was first developed by Harry Percival Mera (1933), drawing on an earlier, number-based key developed by Anna O. Shepard and Alfred V. Kidder (Kidder and Shepard 1936). Here, the first question is: what rim profile is present?

=== Glaze A ===
Profiles of Glaze A rims

Glaze A bowl rims are in-curving and of a consistent thickness. The lips are rounded or squared. Glaze A is often dated from AD 1315 to 1425 (Wilson 2005:47), but the end date applies only from the Albuquerque area north. In the southern part of the range, bowls with Glaze A rims were made until AD 1500 or later (Franklin 2007).

Glaze A pottery was first made in the Albuquerque area (the earliest directly dated examples being from Tijeras Pueblo) and was dominated by red-slipped examples with black interior designs. The exteriors are sometimes painted with isolated elements such as crosses. Pottery of this description is classified as Agua Fria Glaze-on-red. In some of the earliest examples, however, simple white paint designs appear on the exterior; such pottery is classified as Arenal Glaze Polychrome (with crushed rock temper) or Los Padillas Polychrome (with sherd temper) (Wilson 2005:47–48).

As Glaze A pottery spread north, yellow-slipped examples appeared and are known as Cieneguilla Glaze-on-yellow. Yellow-slipped pottery with red matte paint elements outlined in black glaze paint are known as Cieneguilla Glaze Polychrome (Wilson 2005:49–50).

On some Glaze A pottery, the interior slip color differs from the exterior slip color (so that the background colors are different on each side of a potsherd). If the painted design was executed with black glaze paint, the type is known as San Clemente Glaze Polychrome. If the design also includes red matte paint elements (usually outlined in black), the type is known as Pottery Mound Polychrome (Wilson 2005:51–52).

Although most Glaze A rims were quite simple, one contemporary variant has a slightly flaring rim (Honea 1966). Examples with one slip color are classified as Sanchez Glaze-on-red or Sanchez Glaze-on-yellow. Examples with contrasting white (interior) and red (exterior) slips, and with black glaze paint, are termed Sanchez Glaze Polychrome (Wilson 2005:52–54).

=== Glaze B ===
Profile of Glaze B rim

Glaze B bowl rims are also incurving but become thicker towards the lips, which are flat. The resulting profile is somewhat wedge-shaped. Glaze B was made almost exclusively in the region north of Albuquerque; farther south, potters simply continued with the Glaze A rim style. Glaze B dates between AD 1400 and 1450 (Wilson 2005:55).

Glaze B vessels with one slip and black glaze paint are classified as Largo Glaze-on-yellow or Largo Glaze-on-red, the yellow-slipped type being more common. Examples with one slip, and red matte paint outlined in black, are classified as Largo Glaze Polychrome. In this type, the lower portions of bowl exteriors are often unslipped (Wilson 2005:55–57).

Rarely, examples are found with two contrasting (interior versus exterior) slip colors and black glaze paint designs; these are termed Medio Glaze Polychrome.

=== Glaze C ===
Profile of Glaze C rim

Glaze C bowl rims have everted lips. Glaze C was made between AD 1425 and 1500. This rim group has one named type, Espinoso Glaze Polychrome, which includes red matte paint elements outlined in black glaze paint. The contrast between the red paint and the other colors gives Espinoso pots a "gaudy" look. Jar necks are near-vertical and display red designs outlined in black. The bottom of vessel exteriors may be unslipped. In the Glaze C through E periods, vessel designs were almost exclusively polychrome (Wilson 2005:57).

=== Glaze D ===
Profiles of Glaze D rims

Glaze D bowl rims date between AD 1470 and 1515. In profile, rim exteriors exhibit an inward bend (or close to it). The rims themselves are either fairly consistent in thickness, or taper slightly to both the body and the lip. This rim group has one named type, San Lazaro Glaze Polychrome, which includes red matte paint elements outlined in black glaze paint. Some examples lack the red matte paint but are also classified as San Lazaro. Bowl interiors and exteriors both have designs in panels or bands. The black paint is thin but non-runny (Wilson 2005:58).

=== Glaze E ===
Profiles of Glaze E rims. L-R: Pecos, Puaray, Escondido

Most Glaze E bowl rims are substantially thicker than the bodies of the bowls, and "breaks" (discontinuities) in the exterior curve of the bowl are common. After the Spanish colonized New Mexico in 1598, some glaze ware bowls took on distinctly European shapes, for example, soup plates. Glaze E black paint ran during firing. Glaze E was made from 1515 until 1700 (Wilson 2005:59).

Glaze E bowl rims fall into three named categories. Puaray Glaze Polychrome is characterized by thickened rim profiles reminiscent of willow leaves, above a marked break in the exterior profile. The designs included red matte paint elements outlined runny black (or off-black) glaze. When the rims are instead somewhat rectangular in profile, the type becomes Escondido Glaze Polychrome. In the Pecos Pueblo area, Glaze E rims are sometimes instead somewhat "stubby," meaning that the break is near the rim, and that the thickened portion of the rim is correspondingly short. This variant is known as Pecos Glaze Polychrome (McKenna and Miles 1996; Wilson 2005:59–61).

=== Glaze F ===
Profile of Glaze F rim

"Glaze F ... exhibits a significant decline in the glaze and quality of workmanship" (Wilson 2005:62). Glaze F bowl rims retain a break in the exterior profile, but the marked thickening of Glaze E disappears. European-inspired shapes become more common. The glaze paint then in use usually fired to runny brown or green rather than black.

Glaze F vessels with one slip and "black" glaze paint are classified as Kotyiti Glaze-on-red or Kotyiti Glaze-on-yellow. Several design variants are subsumed by Kotyiti Glaze Polychrome. Some examples of that polychrome type have one slip color and red matte paint elements outlined in "black" glaze paint. Others have two slip colors and either "black" glaze paint examples or red-and-black paint examples (Wilson 2005:62).

== Approach based on paint styles ==
Under the Mera system of classification, all types based on painting styles fit neatly as subtypes of the types based on rim forms. In practice, specific painting styles do not form neat subsets of groups defined on rim forms, particularly in the southern portion of the production range. Here, the first question is: does the painted design consist of black elements, or of red and black elements?

=== Black painted designs ===
The first examples of Rio Grande Glaze Ware carried on a centuries-old tradition of black painted designs on a lighter background. The next question is: was the slipped background (1) red, (2) yellow, or (3) contrasting colors, one on the inside of the vessel, the other on the outside?

==== Red slip backgrounds ====
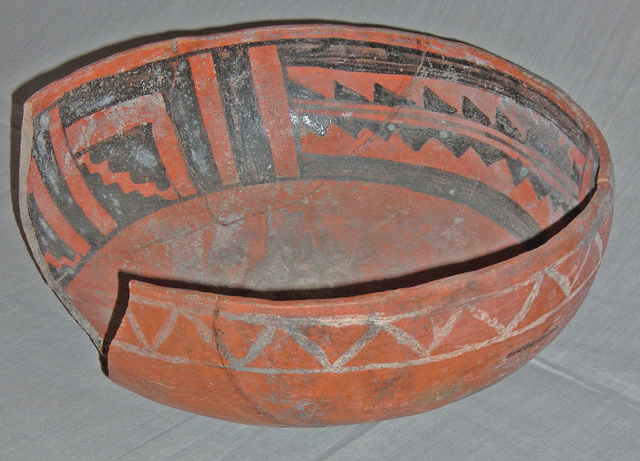
Los Padillas Polychrome bowl

Arenal Glaze Polychrome and Los Padillas Polychrome feature red-slipped bowls with simple interior designs painted in black glaze paint; the former has crushed rock temper while the latter has crushed sherd temper. The bowl exteriors include simple designs in white matte paint. The overall layout (black-on-red interiors, white-on-red exteriors) is a carryover from White Mountain Red Ware. Arenal dates from AD 1315 to 1350(?) and is found from Albuquerque south—the same area of its supposed ancestor, Los Padillas Polychrome.

Agua Fria Glaze-on-red lacks white paint on bowl exteriors, but is otherwise identical to Arenal. Agua Fria bowls are red-slipped. The black glaze paint is usually dull and non-runny. The black designs are usually laid out in bands on the upper part of bowl interiors. The upper exteriors sometimes have slashes, crosses, or similar isolated motifs. Jars with black-on-red exterior designs also occur. Agua Fria Glaze-on-red occurs throughout the Rio Grande Glaze Ware area. It dates from AD 1315 to 1425 throughout its range, and later (possibly as late as 1550) in the southern portion of its range. Honea (1966) describes a variant of Agua Fria Glaze-on-red with a slightly out-flaring rim, Sanchez Glaze-on-red. This type is found north of Albuquerque and dates from AD 1350 to 1425.

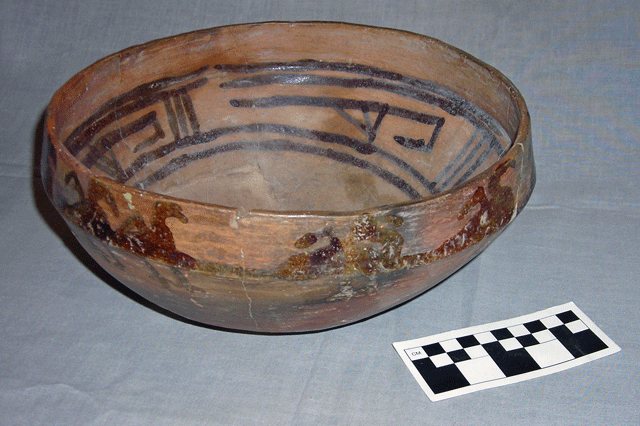
Kotyiti Glaze-on-red bowl

When B rims rather than A rims are present, this type becomes Largo Glaze-on-red (AD 1400 to 1450). Afterwards, all-black painted designs appear to have given way to black-and-red painted designs until the Spanish Colonial period, when some vessels revert to this simpler design scheme. During the Spanish Colonial period, when F rims are present, this type becomes Kotyiti Glaze-on-Red (AD 1625 to 1700).

==== Yellow slip backgrounds ====
When the slip is more yellow than red, black-design vessels are called Cieneguilla Glaze-on-yellow. This style is found north of Albuquerque and may represent a local innovation as the making of glaze ware pottery spread northward. Cieneguilla dates from AD 1325 to 1425. In the Galisteo Basin, a variant of this type with a slightly flaring lip is known as Sanchez Glaze-on-yellow (Honea 1966) and dates from AD 1350 to 1425.

When B rims rather than A Rims are present, black-on-yellow bowls are classified as "Largo Glaze-on-yellow." This type dates from AD 1400 to 1450. Afterwards, all-black painted designs appear to have died out until the Spanish Colonial period, when some vessels revert to this simpler design scheme. During the Spanish Colonial period, when F rims are present, the named type is Kotyiti Glaze-on-yellow (AD 1625 to 1700).

==== Contrasting slip backgrounds ====
Early on, potters also learned to make some vessels with contrasting slips—one background color on the inside of the vessel, a different background color on the outside. The options included the red and yellow slip clays used on one-slip vessels, as well as white slip clay probably imported from the west.

San Clemente Glaze Polychrome dates from AD 1315 (?—this is probably too early) to 1425. In this type, the interior and exterior of each bowl is slipped in a different color. (In jars, the uppermost and most easily reached part of the interior is slipped a different color.) The black glaze paint design applied over the slip often includes dots and serrated lines. San Clemente Polychrome occurs from Albuquerque south.

Honea (1966) has described a variant on San Clemente Glaze Polychrome, Sanchez Glaze Polychrome. The Sanchez variant has a "slightly out-flaring rim resembling Glaze C rims, but thicker" (Wilson 2005:54). This rare variant consists of bowls, which are found north of Albuquerque.

Late in the sequence, a variant appears in which black paint designs appear over contrasting interior and exterior slips, with Glaze F rims. This combination is called Kotyiti Glaze Polychrome, however, the same name is used for F rim examples with red-and-black painted designs (see below).

=== Red and black painted designs ===
Almost immediately, it seems, the Rio Grande area potters branched out from black-design tradition of White Mountain Red Ware, adding a scheme involving black and red paint designs on a lighter background. Where red (matte) paint was used, it was almost always outlined in black glaze paint. This specific artistic canon may have been inspired by Ramos Polychrome, a type of pottery made in northwest Chihuahua beginning about 1200. The next question is: was the slip background (1) a single color (which could vary), or (2) contrasting colors?

==== Single background colors ====
The use of red-and-black painted designs apparently began on vessels with yellow slips, but as time went on other slip colors were used. The probable first type in this tradition was Cieneguilla Glaze Polychrome, which differs from Cieneguilla Black-on-yellow by the addition of red (matte) paint elements outlined in black (glaze) paint. Cieneguilla Polychrome dates from AD 1325 to 1425. When B rims rather than A rims are present, this type becomes Largo Glaze Polychrome (AD 1400 to 1450).

When C rims are present, the type becomes Espinoso Glaze Polychrome (AD 1425 to 1500). By Espinoso, the slip tends to be off-white rather than yellow, causing the designs to appear more "gaudy." This background color may be in imitation of contemporary Acoma-Zuni wares. Espinoso Glaze Polychrome is most common north of Albuquerque.

When D rims are present, the type becomes San Lazaro Glaze Polychrome (AD 1470 to 1515). The background slip color reverted to a tan-reddish continuum. In some instances the red matte paint was not used, and strictly speaking those examples are glaze-on-red designs, not polychrome.

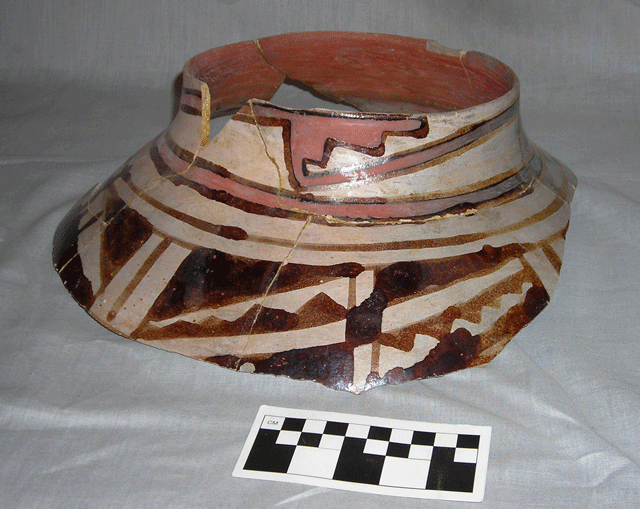
Puaray Glaze Polychrome jar neck and upper shoulder

When E rims are present, the type becomes Puaray Glaze Polychrome (willow-leaf profiles; AD 1515 to 1650) or Escondido Glaze Polychrome (rectangular profiles; AD 1515 to 1650[?]). (Jars, such as the one shown, have different rims and are always classed as Puaray rather than as Escondido.) The background slip color ranges from an off-white to yellow or red. By this point the black glaze paint is "runny" (during firing), giving the finished vessels a sloppy look. It is not clear whether the runny look is deliberate (due to a change in the paint formula) or unavoidable (due to a change in the available raw minerals). In the area, a local variant, Pecos Glaze Polychrome, has "stubby" thickened rims; this variant dates from AD 1515 to 1700.

When F rims are present, the type becomes Kotyiti Glaze Polychrome (AD 1625 to 1700), however, the same type name is applied to F rim examples in the San Lazaro (two slip) tradition. Kotyiti Glaze Polychrome is characterized by slapdash designs and by the use of runny glaze black paint.

==== Contrasting background colors ====
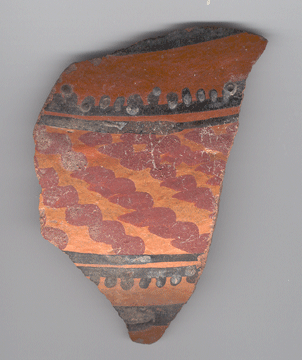
Pottery Mound Glaze Polychrome Jar Sherd

Pottery Mound Polychrome is considered a variant of San Clemente Glaze Polychrome, in the sense that the San Clemente slip scheme (different slip color on interiors and exteriors) is combined with the canon of red matte paint outlined in black glaze paint. In some of the most boldly executed examples of this type, however red matte paint designs are sometimes not framed in black. The background colors used in contrasting pairs include red (grading to orange), yellow (grading to olive), and white (probably using slip clay from the Acoma area, in imitation of Acoma-Zuni wares). Pottery Mound Polychrome dates from AD 1400 to 1490. The sole center of production was Pottery Mound, a village on the lower Rio Puerco (east).

Eckert (2003, 2006) breaks this pottery into two types. She uses "Pottery Mound Polychrome" to describe A rim bowls slipped yellow to buff on the interior surface and red on the exterior surface, and dates the type from AD 1375 to 1450 or later. She uses "Hidden Mountain Polychrome" for A or C rim bowls are slipped red on the interior surface and white on the exterior surface, and dates the type from AD 1400 to 1450 or later. By her standards, the bowl sherd with a C rim shown here is Hidden Mountain Polychrome, not Pottery Mound Polychrome.

== Tabular approach to classification ==
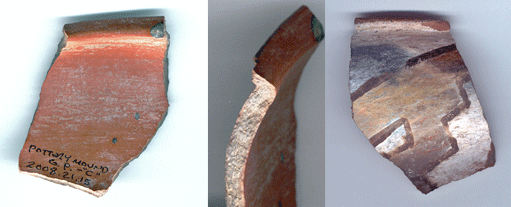
Pottery Mound Glaze Polychrome bowl sherd with C rim

The Mera system, which first keys off rim profiles, is probably best suited to the northern portion of the glaze ware production area—in other words, in the area Mera relied on to develop his system. One recently developed alternative approach, by Franklin (2007), reflects work in the southern portion of the glaze ware area, where the Mera system works less well. Franklin's system recognizes the cross-cutting nature of rim forms and painted designs in the Rio Grande Glaze Ware. In his system, therefore, a bowl with black glaze paint on a red slip background is classified "Agua Fria Glaze-on-red" regardless of rim form, and the rim forms (A, B, etc.) are separately recorded for the sherds thus classified. One advantage of this approach is its flexibility. In Wilson (2005), for example, Pottery Mound Polychrome is listed as a Glaze A type but at the production center, Pottery Mound, it occurs with other rim forms (Franklin 2007).
