= Frank C. Hibben =

American archaeologist (1910–2002)

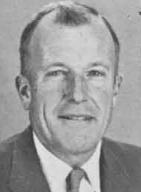
Hibben in 1964

Frank Cumming Hibben (December 5, 1910 – June 11, 2002) was a well-known archaeologist whose research emphasized the U.S. Southwest. He was a professor for the University of New Mexico (UNM) and a noted author of popular books and articles. He was also controversial, being suspected of scientific fraud concerning his studies of Paleo-Indian cultures.

Correspondence in Nature has emphasized that Hibben’s legacy should not be defined by accusations, as controversy is common in research and differs from misconduct. No formal charges were filed against him, and he was a respected mentor who helped popularize modern archaeology.

== Early life ==
Hibben was born on December 5, 1910, in Lakewood, Ohio. He became interested in archaeology as a child, working summers at digs. He received his bachelor's degree in archaeology from Princeton University in 1933 and a master's degree in zoology from the University of New Mexico in 1936.

== Career ==
While a graduate student, Hibben was put in charge of the university's archaeology collections (the core of what became the Maxwell Museum of Anthropology). He returned East for one year to attend Harvard University, which awarded him a Ph.D. in anthropology in 1940. Hibben then taught at UNM until his retirement, except for a period of service with the U.S. Navy during World War II.

During much of his career, Hibben was the director of the Maxwell Museum of Anthropology.

Hibben's first marriage and subsequent investments made him a millionaire. In 2000, he donated part of his fortune to build an archaeology research building at UNM. (Due to the controversies concerning his career, the decision to name the new building after him was questioned.) When Hibben died, the remainder of his fortune was used, as he had directed, to endow scholarships at UNM.

The main cause of the controversies was Hibben's claim to have found a deposit with pre-Clovis artifacts (including projectile points, which he termed "Sandia points") in Sandia Cave (in the Sandia Mountains near Albuquerque, New Mexico). Hibben believed the layers to be about 25,000 years old, much older than the Paleo-Indian cultures documented previously in the U.S. Southwest. The layers also included the bones of Pleistocene species such as camels, mastodons, and horses.

The 25,000 year age for the "Sandia Man" deposits was a best guess based on the strata in the cave, and was later questioned, partly as a result of radiocarbon dating. Also, research notes by Wesley Bliss (who had excavated in the cave in 1936) and others indicate that animal burrowing had resulted in a mixing of deposits. The notion of a "Sandia Man" occupation of the U.S. Southwest is no longer accepted by professional archaeologists, but that in itself is not the source of controversy. Instead, some researchers believe that artifacts were placed fraudulently in the cave deposits to support the notion of occupation by "Sandia Man". Those who believe that fraud was committed often suspect Hibben of being involved with the fraud. The evidence is inconclusive, however, and Hibben maintained his innocence in the matter until his death.

In 1941, Hibben stole a totem pole which he brought to Albuquerque via Alaska. He claimed to have purchased the totem pole, and that it was Tlingit in origin. After Hibben's death, it was determined that pole, now known as the Smith Family Totem Pole, had been created 1907 by the Smith Family of the Tlowitsis Nation in British Columbia. According to the Tlowitsis, Hibben had attempted to purchase the pole and was rebuffed. They migrated seasonally to another village, and when they returned the pole was gone. In 2017, a team led by Kwakwaka'wakw artist and carver Tom Hunt Jr. and his apprentice Bertram Smith, restored the pole, and the Smith family and Tlowitsis Nation transferred stewardship of the pole to the Maxwell Museum of Anthropology. At the request of the Tlowitsis Nation, the Maxwell Museum paid for a replica to be created and erected in British Columbia.

In 1943, Hibben described a visit to Chinitna Bay on the west side of Cook Inlet in Alaska, where he reported finding Yuma-like projectile points like those found at the Clovis Site in New Mexico and a projectile point similar to those produced by the Folsom culture, who lived on the High Plains and adjacent regions 10,000 years ago. In addition to the projectile points, he reported finding mammoth bones. A later investigation of the geology and geoarchaeology of Chinitna Bay using personal notes, photographs, and directions supplied personally by Hibben relocated successfully the locations and strata from which the mammoth bones, Yuma-like projectile points, and projectile point "possibly affiliated with, Folsom" were reported. They found that the strata in which Hibben reported finding Folsom- and Yuma-like projectile points and mammoths bones all accumulated during the Late Holocene in "a muddy, intertidal environment". As result, they concluded that the projectile points are not associated with any Paleo-Indian cultures and the identification of the bones as being those of a mammoth is questionable.

While a graduate student he excavated and reported on Riana Ruin in the drainage area of the Rio Chama. His Harvard dissertation was based on extensive field studies of the Gallina Culture of northern New Mexico. In 1954 he began a long term research project on Pottery Mound, a site best known for its many kiva murals. Hibben also excavated at Comanche Springs south of Albuquerque, locating remains from the Spanish Colonial period and other periods.

In addition to being an archaeologist, Hibben was a big-game hunter, and was awarded the Weatherby Hunting and Conservation Award in 1964. He also served in various capacities related to wild animals, such as chairman of the Albuquerque Zoological Board (1960–1970) and chairman of the New Mexico State Game and Fish Commission (1961–1971). Hibben's big game experience informed a series of popular books and articles about hunting.

== See also ==
- Los Lunas Decalogue Stone

== Selected publications ==
- "Association of Man with Pleistocene Mammals in the Sandia Mountains, New Mexico," American Antiquity, 2(4):260-263. [the first article to describe Sandia Cave).
- The Lost Americans (1946)
- Hunting American Lions (1948)
- Hunting American Bears (1950)
- Treasure in the Dust (1951)
- Prehistoric Man in Europe (1958)
- Digging Up America (1960)
- Hunting in Africa (1962)
- Kiva Art of the Anasazi (1975)
- Under the African Sun (1999)
