= Robert Thomas Moore =

American ornithologist (1882–1958)

R. T. Moore
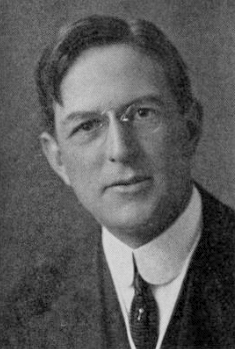
- Born: June 24, 1882; Haddonfield, New Jersey, U.S.
- Died: October 30, 1958 (aged 76); Flintridge, California, U.S.
- Education: University of Pennsylvania; Harvard University
- Known for: New species Moore collection
- Scientific career
- Fields: Ornithology

Robert Thomas "R. T." Moore (June 24, 1882 – October 30, 1958) was an American businessman, ornithologist, philanthropist, and founder and editor-in-chief of the Borestone Mountain Poetry Awards. In his obituary, Lionel Stevenson wrote, "Robert Thomas Moore was an exceptional amalgam of the poet, the scientist, and the man of affairs."

== Biography ==
Moore was born in Haddonfield, New Jersey, on June 24, 1882, the son of Henry D. Moore, a wealthy Philadelphia businessman. Moore earned a bachelor's degree from the University of Pennsylvania in 1904 and an Master of Arts degree from Harvard University in 1905 in English literature. Moore's father was from Maine, and owned a family vacation camp at Big Benson. Moore purchased land on Borestone Mountain in Maine and began the Borestone Mountain Fox Company. The company ran several fur farms that raised foxes for their pelts, which were used for fur garments. In 1921, the Borestone Mountain farm was referred to as "the leading [fur] ranch in North America". In the 1920s, Moore opened the Borestone Mountain Ranch, which was a fur farm near Big Bear Lake in Southern California.

In addition to his business activities, Moore was an active ornithologist, who published about 60 scientific papers. From 1911 to 1916, Moore edited Cassinia, which is the journal of the Delaware Valley Ornithological Club. Moore moved to California around 1929, and became an associate of the Department of Zoology at the California Institute of Technology. In 1933, he hired Chester C. Lamb to help build his collection of birds; Lamb worked with Moore on the project for 22 years, collecting about 40,000 bird and mammal specimens in Mexico from 1933 until 1955. Herbert Friedmann has written that Moore's "great achievement was his forming of the Moore collection, containing about 65,000 birds, over 80% of which are from Mexico, and 1,000 mammals, now housed in a building given by him to Occidental College in Los Angeles, with an endowment for its maintenance and for furthering studies on American birds, particularly those of Mexico and adjacent areas." The Moore Laboratory of Zoology at Occidental College is still in operation half a century following Moore's death; the present director is Dr. John E. McCormack. Friedmann also particularly notes Moore's discovery of two new bird species and a genus; Moore is credited at the Integrated Taxonomic Information System with the discoveries of five bird species (the tufted jay, masked mountain-tanager, maroon-fronted parrot, short-crested coquette, and Balsas screech-owl) and 30 subspecies.

Moore was first to climb the Ecuadorian stratovolcano Sangay in 1929. From 1934 to 1938, Moore chaired the Galápagos Commission of Ecuador, which has worked to conserve the natural history of the Galápagos Islands. In 1940, he was elected a Fellow of the American Ornithologists' Union.

In 1946, Moore established the Borestone Mountain Poetry Awards. In 1949, he published an anthology of poems selected from those published in 1948 by English-language magazines around the world; the authors of several of these poems were awarded cash prizes by a panel of noted poets working as volunteer judges. The prizes and publication of the anthology were continued annually through 1977, well past Moore's death in 1958. Moore had established a charitable foundation to underwrite the expenses of administering the prizes and publishing the anthology.

Moore died at his home in Flintridge, California on October 30, 1958. Upon his death, he bequeathed the land he owned on Borestone Mountain to the Audubon Society; the Audubon holdings were later enlarged by additional gifts from Moore's son and daughter and from others to its present size of 1,639 acres (663 ha). In 2000, ownership of the sanctuary was transferred to the Maine Audubon Society; the sanctuary is open to hikers, and incorporates the Robert Thomas Moore Nature Center.
