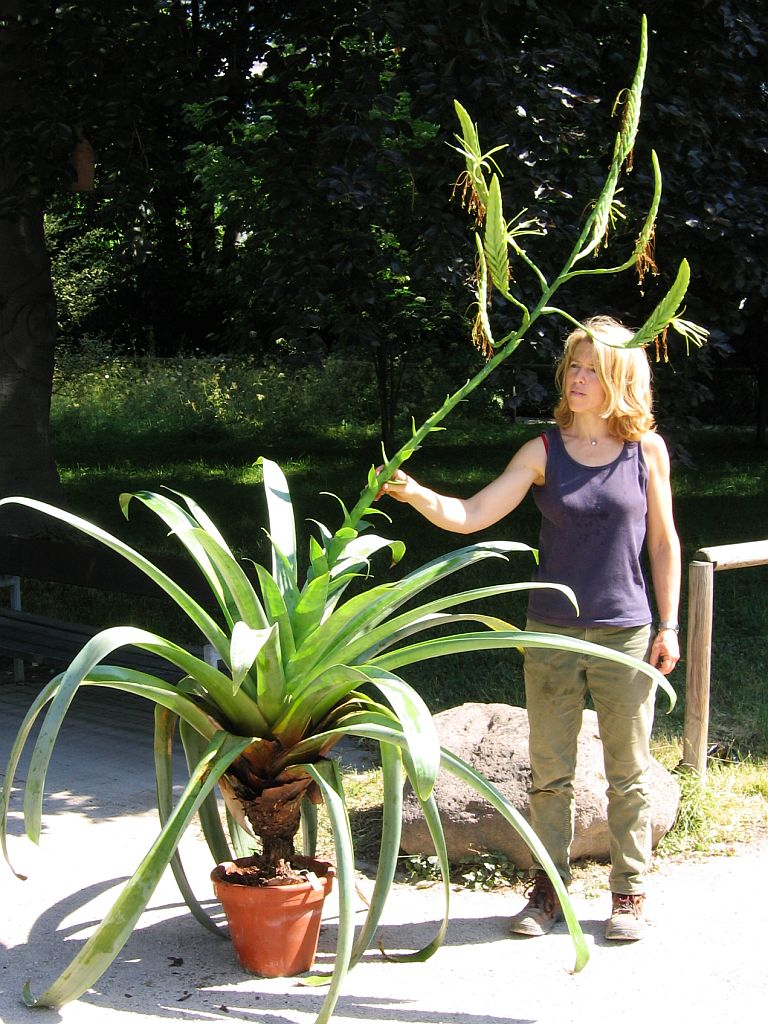
- Pseudalcantarea grandis

Scientific classification
- Kingdom: Plantae
- Clade: Embryophytes
- Clade: Tracheophytes
- Clade: Spermatophytes
- Clade: Angiosperms
- Clade: Monocots
- Clade: Commelinids
- Order: Poales
- Family: Bromeliaceae
- Subfamily: Tillandsioideae
- Genus: Pseudalcantarea (Mez) Pinzón & Barfuss

Synonyms
- Tillandsia subg. Pseudalcantarea C.Presl

= Pseudalcantarea =

Genus of plants

Pseudalcantarea is a genus of flowering plants belonging to the family Bromeliaceae. Its native range is Mexico to Central America. It was first described as the subgenus Pseudalcantarea of Tillandsia before being raised to a full genus in 2016.

== Species ==
Image	Scientific name	Distribution
	Pseudalcantarea grandis (Schltdl.) Pinzón & Barfuss	Mexico (Veracruz, Oaxaca, Puebla, and Queretaro), Guatemala, and Honduras
	Pseudalcantarea macropetala (Wawra) Pinzón & Barfuss	southern Mexico.
	Pseudalcantarea viridiflora (Beer) Pinzón & Barfuss	Mexico, Guatemala, Honduras and Nicaragua
