= Pseudalcantarea macropetala =

Scientific classification
- Kingdom: Plantae
- Clade: Tracheophytes
- Clade: Angiosperms
- Clade: Monocots
- Clade: Commelinids
- Order: Poales
- Family: Bromeliaceae
- Subfamily: Tillandsioideae
- Genus: Pseudalcantarea
- Species: P. macropetala

Binomial name
- Pseudalcantarea macropetala (Wawra) Pinzón & Barfuss

Synonyms
- Tillandsia macropetala Wawra; Tillandsia viridiflora var. variegata Seaborn

Species of plant

Pseudalcantarea macropetala, synonym Tillandsia macropetala, is a species of flowering plant in the family Bromeliaceae, native to central and southern Mexico. It was first described by Heinrich Wawra von Fernsee in 1887 as Platystachys viridiflora.
