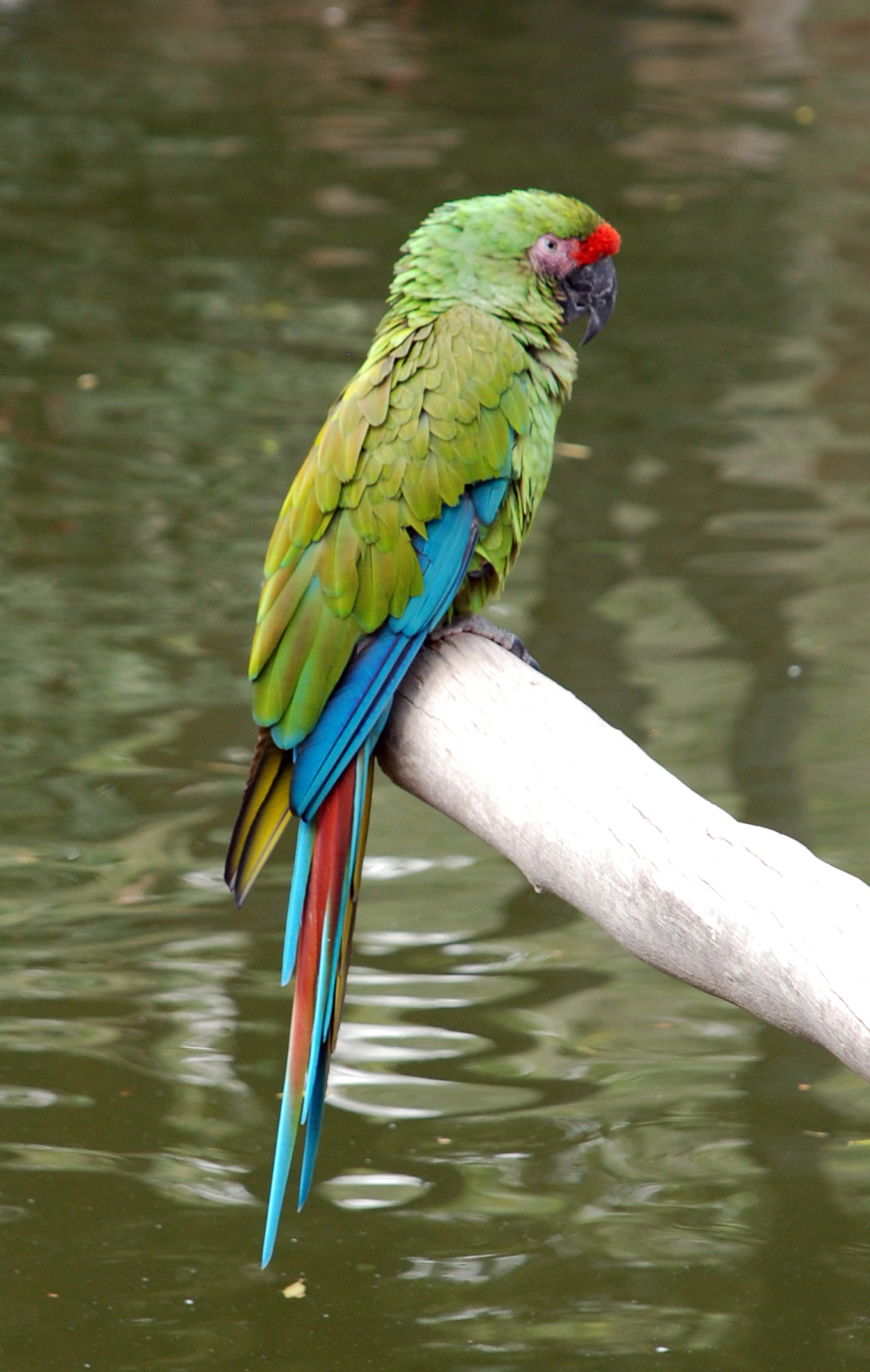
- A military macaw at Wildlife World Zoo & Aquarium, Arizona

Conservation status
- Vulnerable (IUCN 3.1)
- CITES Appendix I

Scientific classification
- Kingdom: Animalia
- Phylum: Chordata
- Class: Aves
- Order: Psittaciformes
- Family: Psittacidae
- Genus: Ara
- Species: A. militaris

Binomial name
- Ara militaris (Linnaeus, 1766)
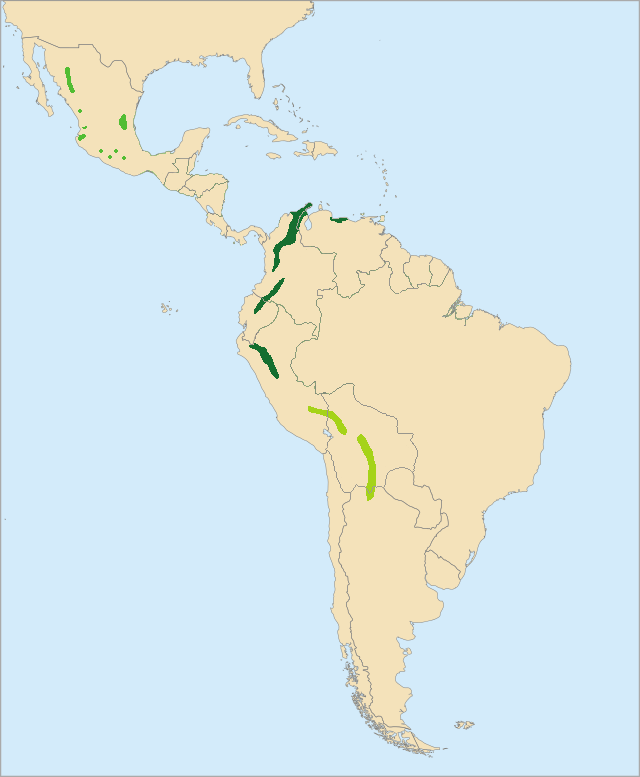
- Distribution of the three subspecies of military macaw

Synonyms
- Psittacus militaris Linnaeus, 1766

= Military macaw =

Species of bird

The military macaw (Ara militaris) is a medium to large-sized macaw, named after its green and red plumage vaguely resembling a military uniform. It is native from west-central Mexico south through northern Argentina and Bolivia. While most wild populations are currently listed by the IUCN as vulnerable—and listed as endangered by Mexico—the species is still seen commonly in zoos and parks worldwide. The military macaw may be bred in captivity with relative ease, and is usually available through the pet trade. It is among the longest-lived one can own, requiring advanced knowledge, experience and confidence to keep them healthy, stimulated and thriving.

== Taxonomy ==
The military macaw was formally described in 1766 by Swedish naturalist Carl Linnaeus in the 12 edition of his Systema Naturae, where he placed it within the genus Psittacus, coining the binomial name Psittacus militaris. Linnaeus did not specify a type locality, but it was designated as 'Colombia' in 1912. The military macaw is, now, one of ten species in the genus Ara, designated in 1799 by French naturalist Bernard Germain de Lacépède. The name Ara comes directly from the Tupi word ará ("macaw"), of the native Brazilian Tupi people. The word is also an onomatopoeia of the typically raucous vocalizations made by macaws. The specific epithet militaris is Latin meaning "military".

Three subspecies are recognised:

- Ara militaris mexicanus Ridgway, 1915 – Western México.
- Ara militaris militaris (Linnaeus, 1766) – Colombia, northwestern Venezuela, Ecuador, north and southeastern Perú and northwestern Bolivia.
- Ara militaris bolivianus Reichenow, 1908 – Central Bolivia and northwestern Argentina.

== Description ==
Military macaws measure from 70 to 85 centimeters (28 to 33 inches) long on-average, with a 99–110 cm (39–43 in) wingspan. The birds are mostly green-plumed, with light-blue and yellow flight and tail feathers, and a bright-red patch on the forehead. Their face is bare, as with most macaws, being whitish in colour with black striations. The large, strong bill is a slate-grey, blackish tone, and the iris is yellow.

They are very visually-similar to great green macaws, but can be distinguished by their smaller size, completely black bill, and overall darker, deeper plumage. The two can also be separated by differences in calls and communication, while great green macaws prefer humid forest habitats; military macaws are usually a deciduous forest species. Phylogenetic studies have shown that the two species are sister clades.

The military macaw subspecies also differ from each other in size and coloration; the size variance is generally between 70–80 cm (28–31 in), with the militaris subspecies being the smallest and the mexicana being the largest.

== Behavior ==
Military macaws live in large flocks and can live about 50–60 years in the wild. They can often be heard long before they are seen. They are very noisy birds making a variety of loud cracking and shrieking sounds, including a loud kraa-aak. Military macaw activity has been observed most frequently in the morning and the evening meaning they are most likely a crepuscular species.

=== Food and feeding ===
Military macaws leave their roosts in flocks around dawn to forage. Their diet consists of mostly seeds but also includes fruits and leaves. They have been observed using Pseudalcantarea grandis for water and consuming latex from Plumeria rubra. They have a somewhat narrow diet, meaning that they only eat a small percentage of species of plants that are available to them.

They flock to feed on heaps of clay known as "macaw licks" along riverbanks and sometimes in the interior of the Amazon rainforest. The clay deposits appear to remove toxins found in the seeds and vegetation of the rest of their diet and to provide dietary salt missing from the diet.

=== Breeding ===
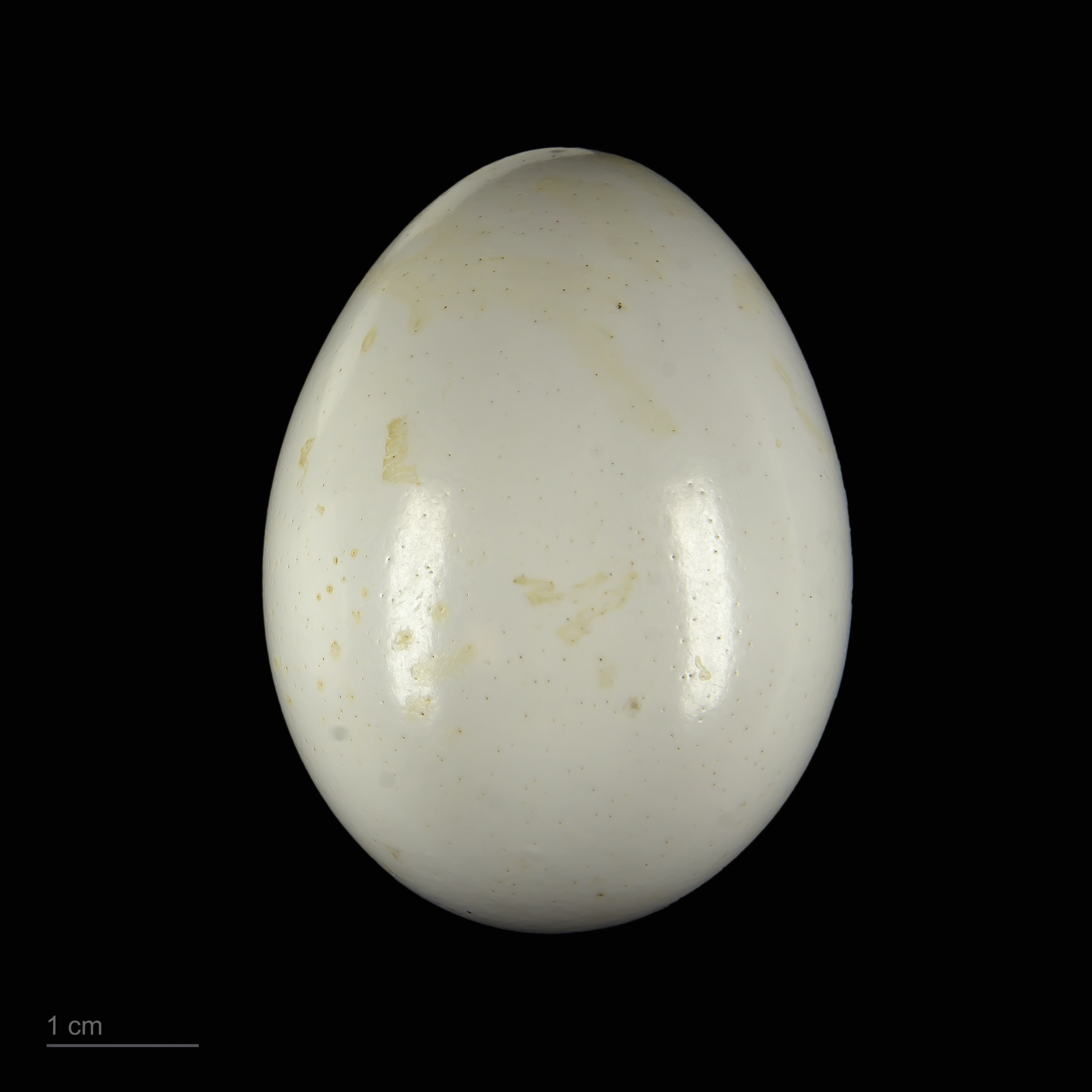
Ara militaris - MHNT

Pair-bonding behaviors include grooming and regurgitation and have been observed during breeding and non-breeding periods. Courtship occurs as early as March, and copulation in May to July. Breeding season is typically between March and October while incubation and hatching occur during August and September. The reproductive season begins with nest selection around October and ends when the chicks fledge between January and March. Military macaws are cavity-nesters and will nest in natural cavities such as holes in trees or on cliffs. They nest in trees at least 15 meters (49 ft) tall and 90 centimeters (35 in) wide. During the breeding season, the male will feed the female 3–4 times a day.

== Distribution and habitat ==
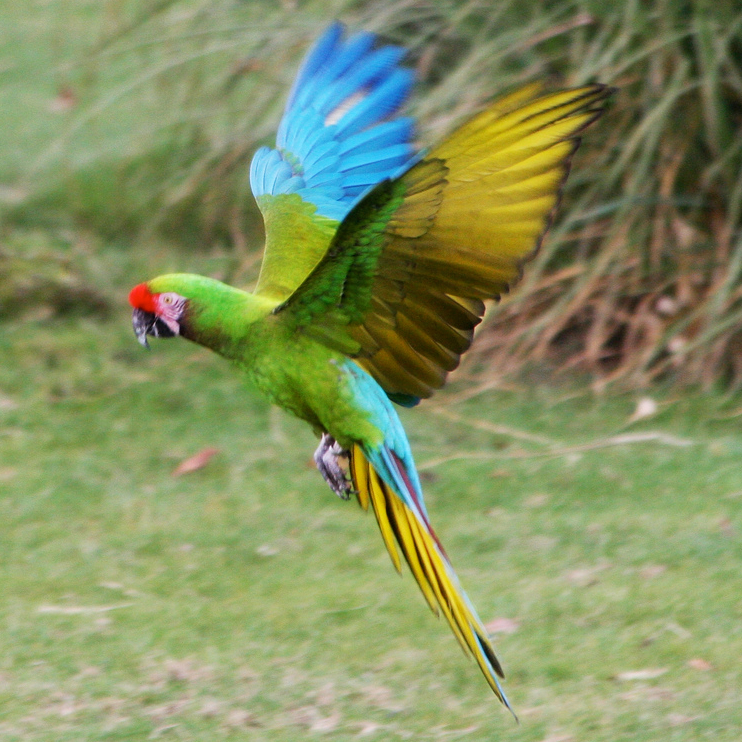
Flying at Whipsnade Zoo

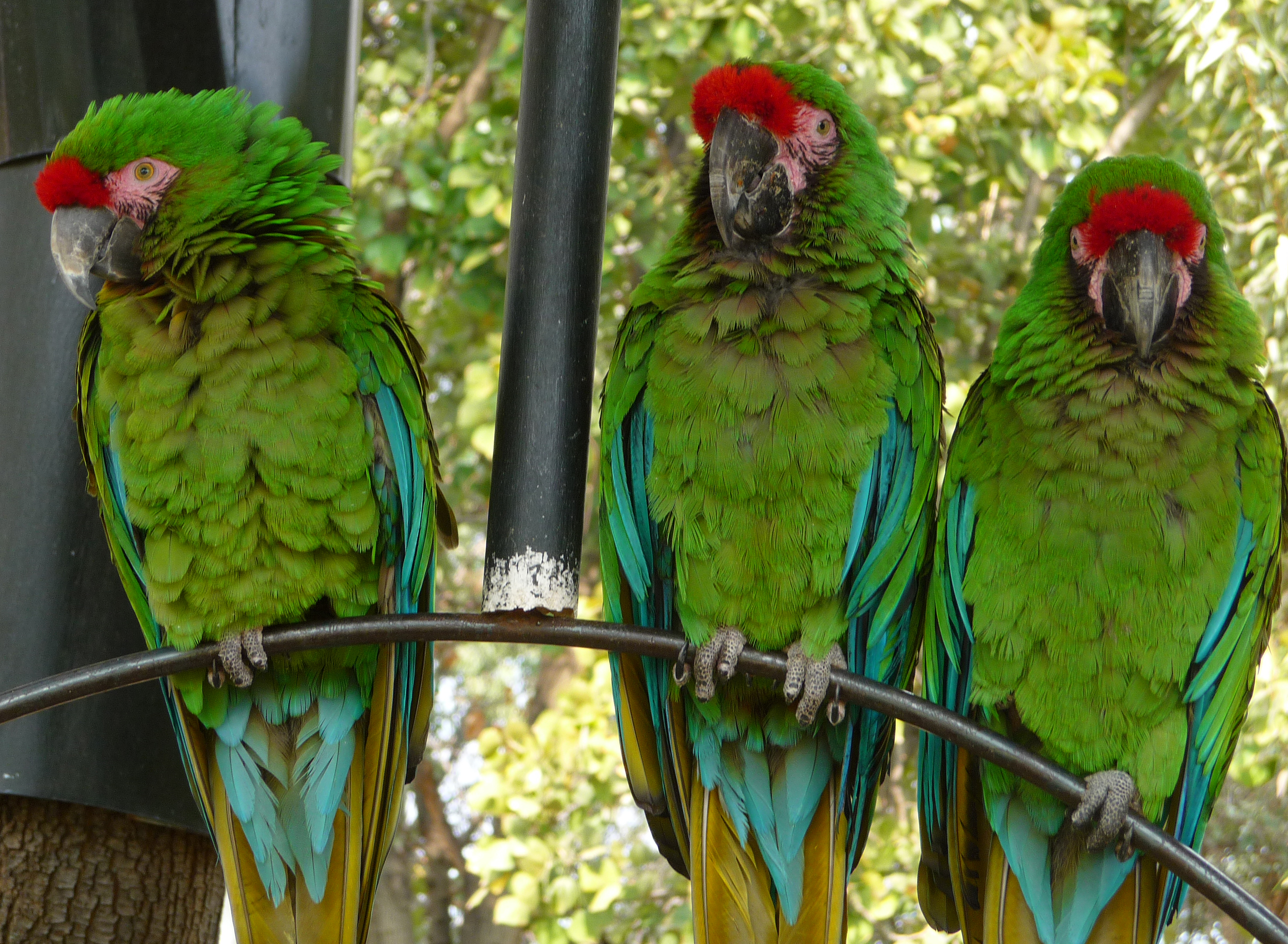
At Zoológico Los Coyotes, Mexico

Military macaws typically inhabit tropical deciduous and semi-deciduous forests. They are a canopy species because they require large canopy trees of deciduous and subdeciduous forests for feeding, breeding, and nesting behavior. They also use canopy trees for protection from predators and heat. They typically live at elevations of 600 to 1,500 m (2,000 to 4,900 ft), higher in the mountains than most macaws ever range. However, these macaws may seasonally fly down to lowlands, where they are likely in humid forests and thorny woodlands. They will nest in the tops of trees 8–28 m off the ground, and more often in cliff faces over 600 ft (180 m) above the ground.

The three subspecies of the military macaw are distinguished geographically. A. m. militaris are found in areas of Bolivia, Peru, Ecuador, Colombia, and Venezuela. A. m. mexicana occupy areas in Mexico and A. m. boliviana live in Bolivia and Argentina. The absence of this species in Central American could be explained by local habitat changes and competition with the closely related great green macaw.

The military macaw has escaped or been deliberately released into Florida, USA, but there is no evidence that the population is breeding and may only persist due to continuing releases or escapes.

== Conservation ==
Military macaws are estimated to only have a breeding population of 2000–7000 individuals and is continuing to decrease. According to the ICUN red list, military macaws are listed as vulnerable as they face threats from habitat loss due to crops, deforestation, mining, and roads, with already extremely fragmented populations. A 2013 paper found that the habitat for populations in tropical dry forests has been reduced by almost 32%. Military macaws are listed as CITES Appendix I which means commercial international trade in wild specimens is prohibited. Despite this, research shows that the trafficking of parrots from South America to North America is still common.

Their narrow diet is also of concern. If the environment were to take a hit and they lost access to too many of their diet species, the species could be greatly affected. There is promise however in that they have a less narrow diet during certain times of the year showing that they may have the ability to adapt if they did lose their typical diet species.

Another conservation concern may be genetic diversity. Military macaws actually have moderate genetic diversity despite their small population, which points to a large ancestral population. Though they have moderate genetic diversity, they are still risk of population bottlenecks due to habitat fragmentation and inbreeding.

== Gallery ==
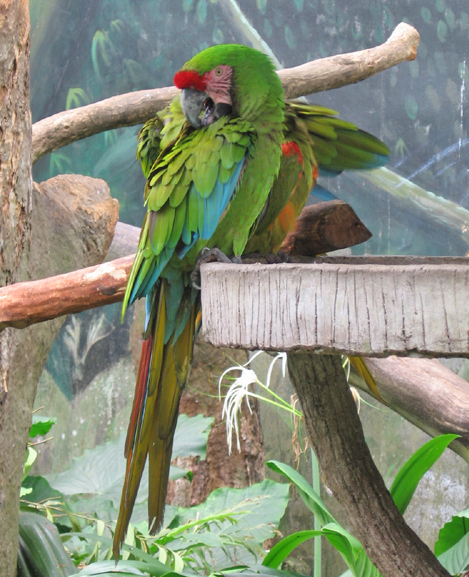
Military macaw in a zoo

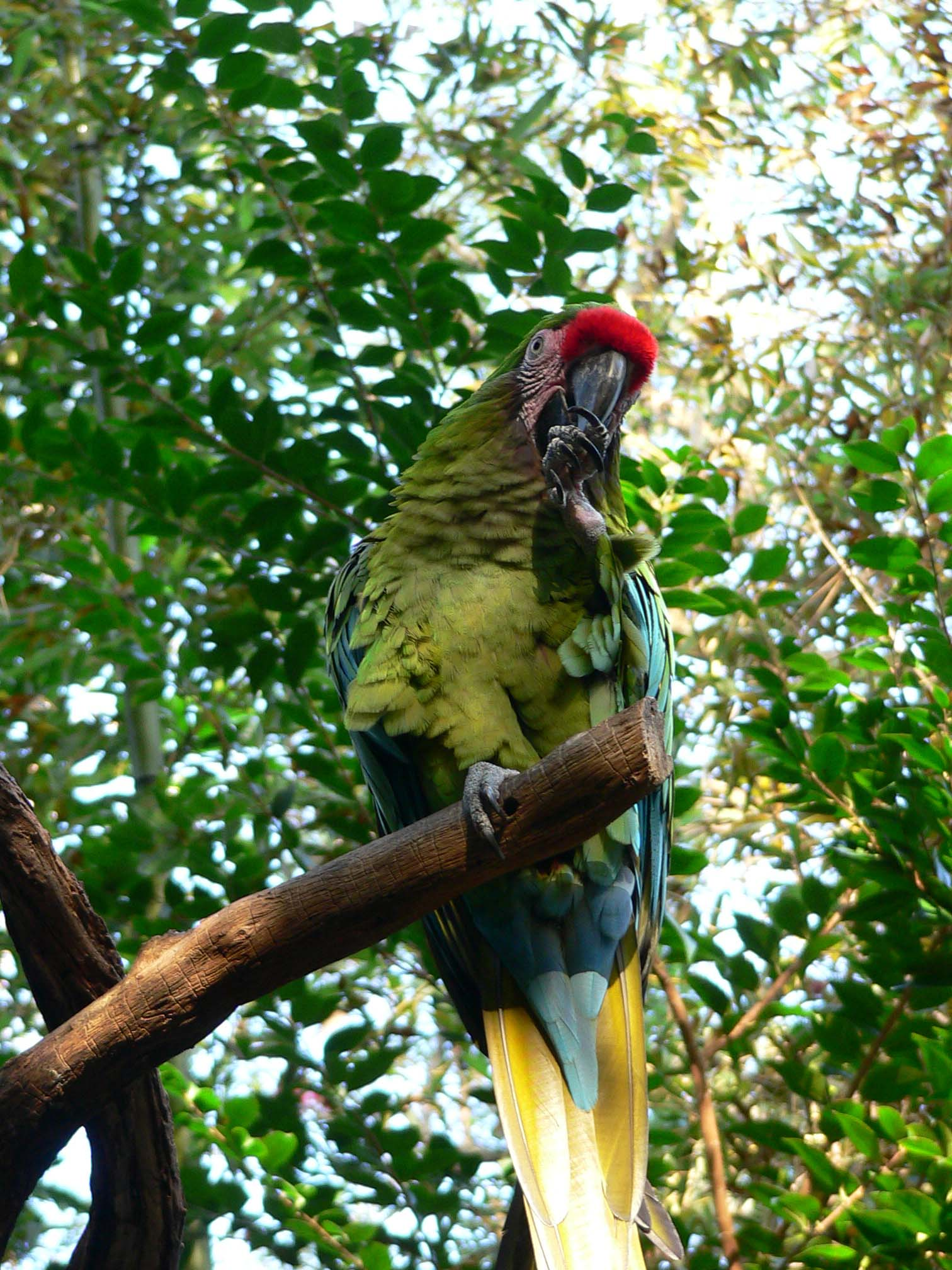
Eating at Disney's Animal Kingdom, Florida

Military macaw alongside scarlet macaw in Morelia, Mexico

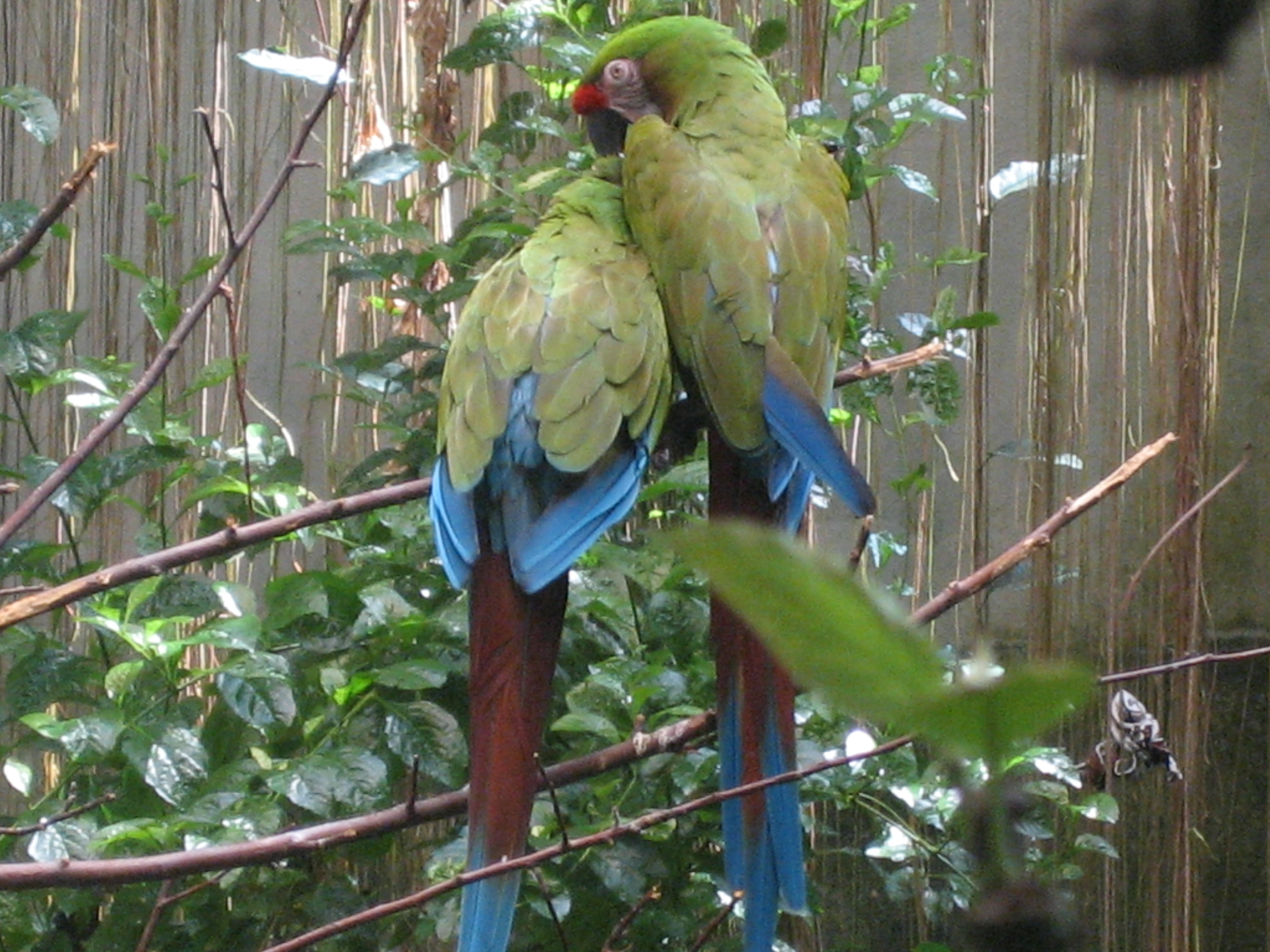
Resting in the Tropical Zone of the Montreal Biodome

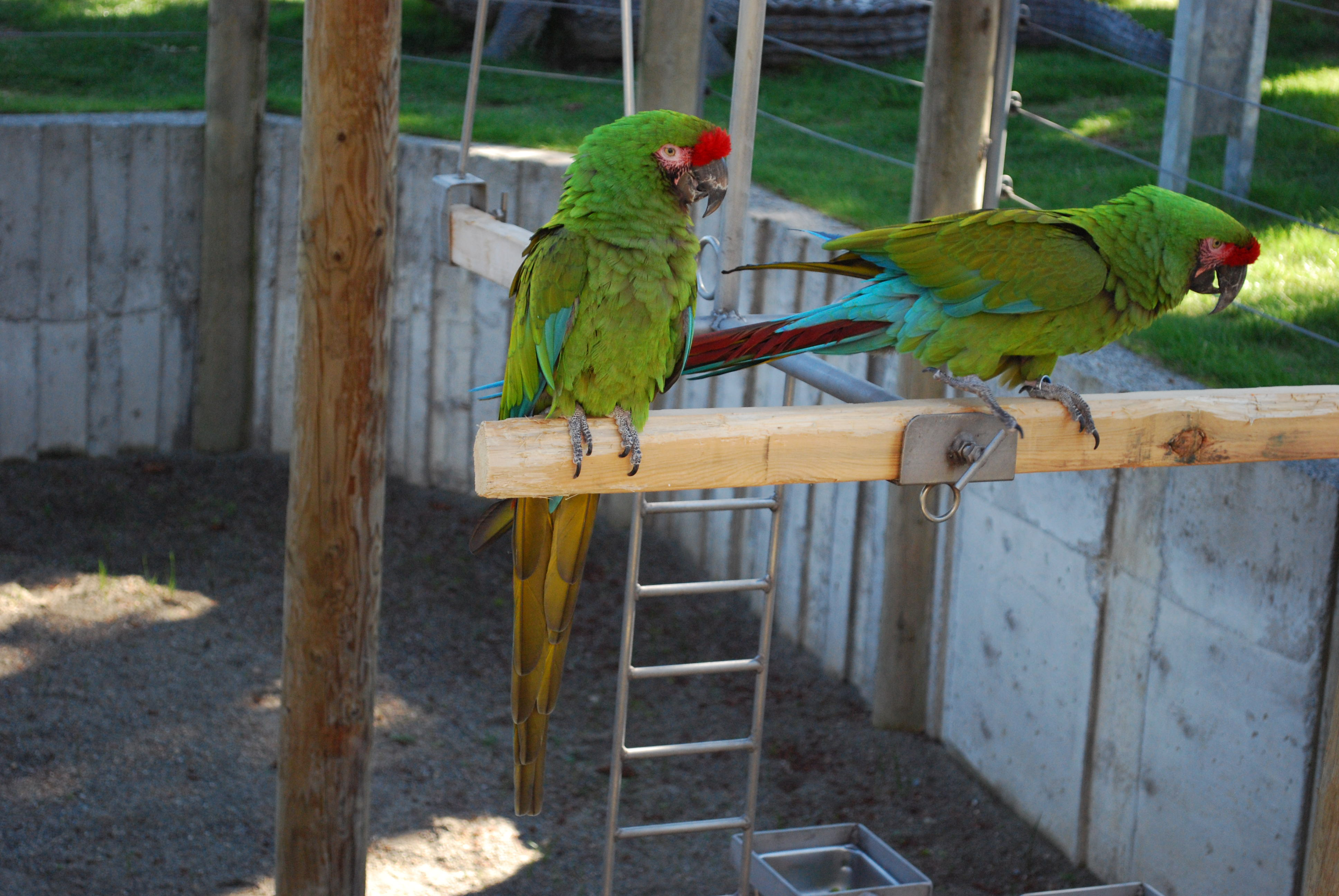
Cougar Mountain Zoo Issaquah, Washington, U.S.

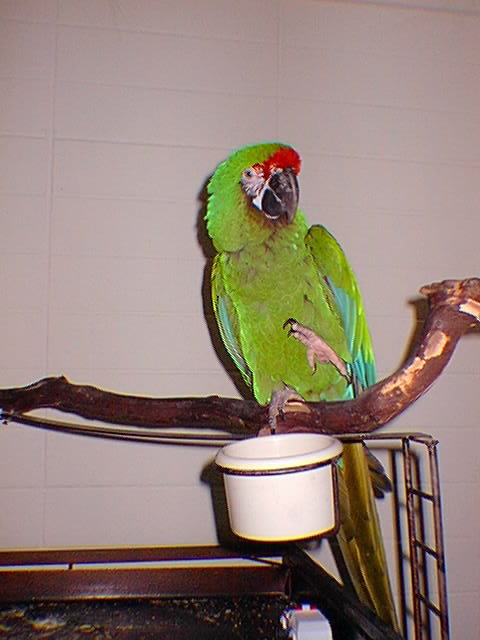
Pet military macaw on a perch
