= Sandia Cave =

- U.S. National Register of Historic Places
- U.S. National Historic Landmark
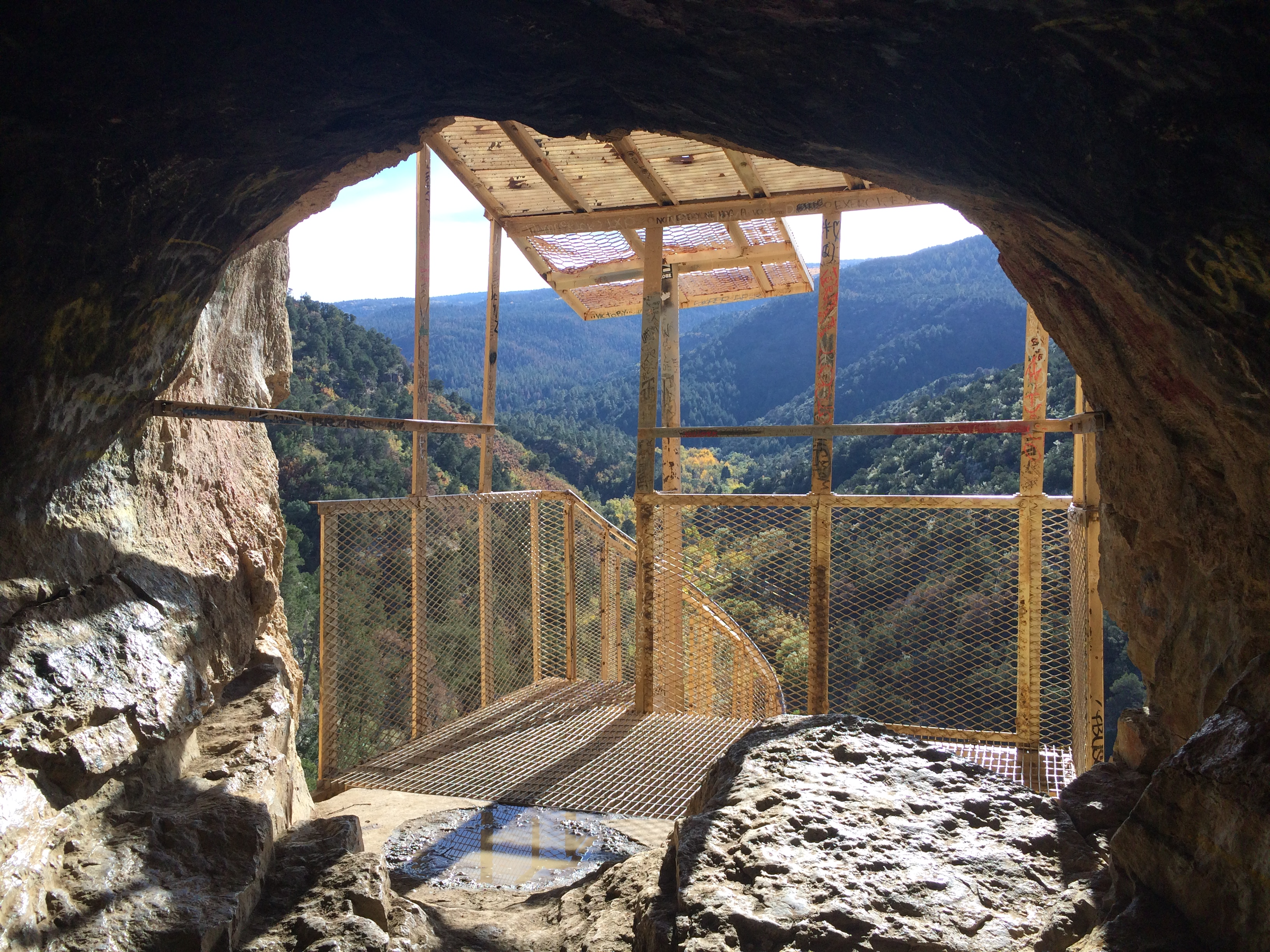
- View from inside the cave.

- Location within New Mexico Location within the United States
- Nearest city: Bernalillo, New Mexico
- Coordinates: 35°15′17″N 106°24′22″W
- Area: 130 acres (53 ha)
- NRHP reference No.: 66000487

Significant dates
- Added to NRHP: October 15, 1966
- Designated NHL: January 20, 1961

Sandia Cave, also called the Sandia Man Cave, is an archaeological site near Bernalillo, New Mexico, within Cibola National Forest. First discovered and excavated in the 1930s, the site exhibits purported evidence of human use from 9,000 to 11,000 years ago. It was declared a National Historic Landmark in 1961. The site is open to the public, up a difficult half-mile trail off New Mexico State Road 165.

== Description ==
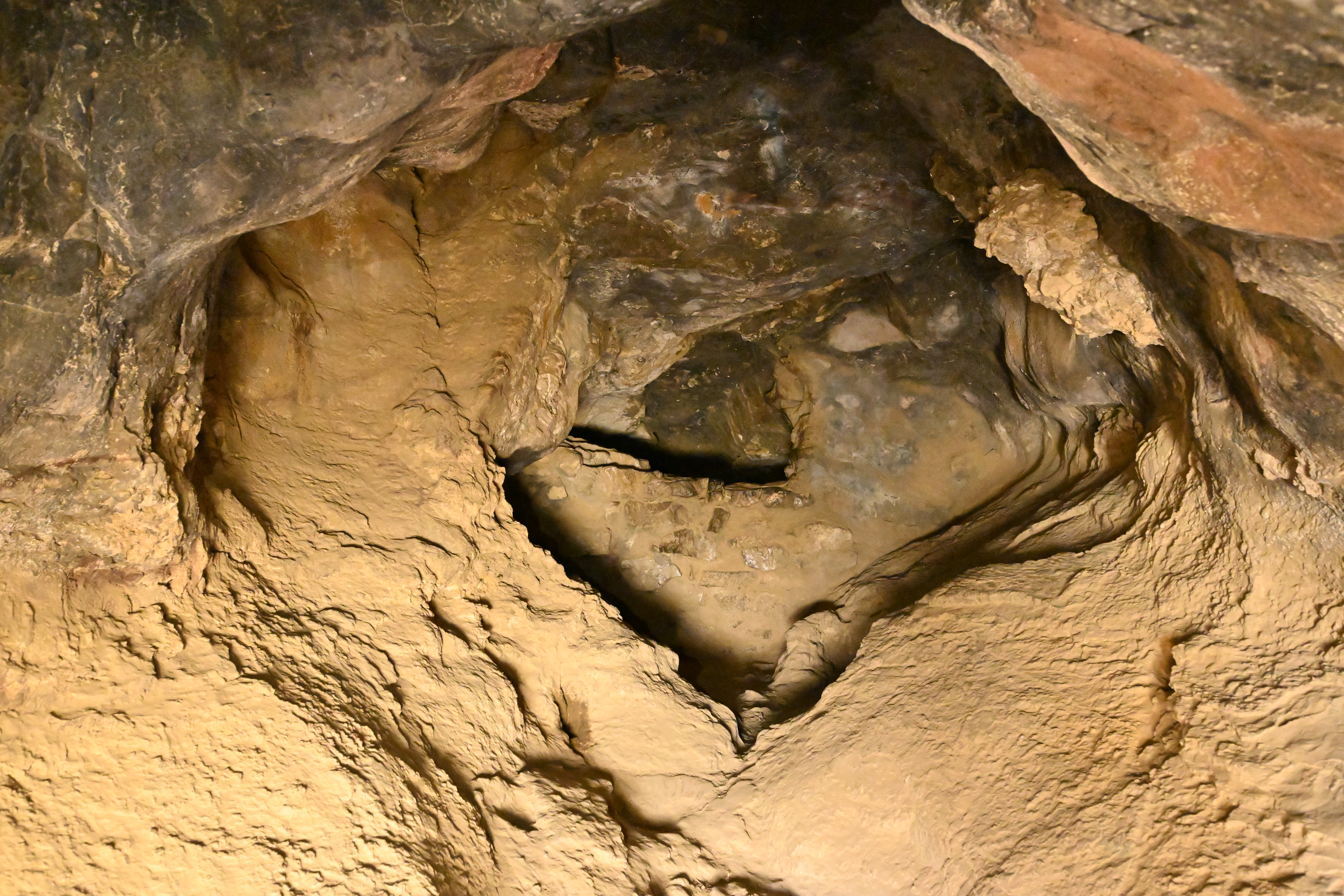
Sandia Cave interior. A partial wall has been built towards the back but the cave continues beyond it.

The Sandia Cave is located on a steep side wall of Las Huertas Canyon, on the north side of the Sandia Mountains northeast of Albuquerque, New Mexico. The public trailhead to access the cave is on the east side of NM165. The site is rather difficult to reach, as it requires traversing ledges and a steep metal staircase.

According to a 2006 report, the cave appears to be in satisfactory condition, since it has been thoroughly excavated, there are no portable artifacts, walls, or fragile components that need to be protected.

== History ==
The cave was discovered in 1936. The site was excavated in the 1930s and 1940s by Frank Hibben while at the University of New Mexico. He claimed to have found the oldest known evidence of humans in the New World, and found a new culture, whose artifacts resembled those of western Europeans, strongly suggesting the first inhabitants of the Americas were Europeans and not far eastern Asiatic as traditionally told. For these reasons the site became so important in the public's mind it was made into a National Historic Landmark in 1961.

Nevertheless, specialists and researchers have disputed claims associated with this site for decades. In 1995, Douglas Preston published an article in The New Yorker that raised many questions about the authenticity of the discoveries. He conducted interviews with specialists who have examined the physical evidence, and interviewed previous colleagues of Hibben. As one example, mammoth bones that Hibben claimed to have retrieved from the cave, to bolster the caves age, were later forensically traced to an industrial gravel pit, far away from the site where mammoth bones were frequently dug up by earth movers and recovered by workers. Experts on stone points found inconsistencies with the artifacts, such as manipulations by modern metal tools to make them appear older.

Folsom and Sandia hunting points were reportedly recovered at the site, with the hitherto unknown Sandia points interpreted by Hibben as being much older than any other evidence of man in North America. This discovery, if accurate, would make it one of the most important prehistoric sites of the New World, but the site does not have this reputation, "It's been thoroughly discredited," Preston said. Later study of stratigraphy and radiometric dates corrected serious earlier misinterpretations, or misrepresentations, leaving "Sandia Man" as definitely younger than earlier claimed.

Faunal remains, supposedly recovered by Hibben and his crew at the site, include extinct animals such as mammoth, mastodon, sloth, horses, and camels, as well as many mammal and bird species that survived the end of the Pleistocene, which if accurate, would make it one of the most important Pleistocene paleontological sites in northern New Mexico.

Preston says that among professional academics, Sandia Man is no longer taught very much in schools (as of 1995), and it has been removed or deprecated from most textbooks. In 1996, Hibben claimed he sued Preston, and The New Yorker, for libel over the piece, and they were in settlement negotiations. However no lawsuit ever occurred, it was, according to Preston, "just another lie".

== See also ==
- List of National Historic Landmarks in New Mexico
- National Register of Historic Places listings in Sandoval County, New Mexico
