= Pottery Mound =

Ancient Village in New Mexico, USA

Coordinates: 34°48′22″N 106°44′00″W

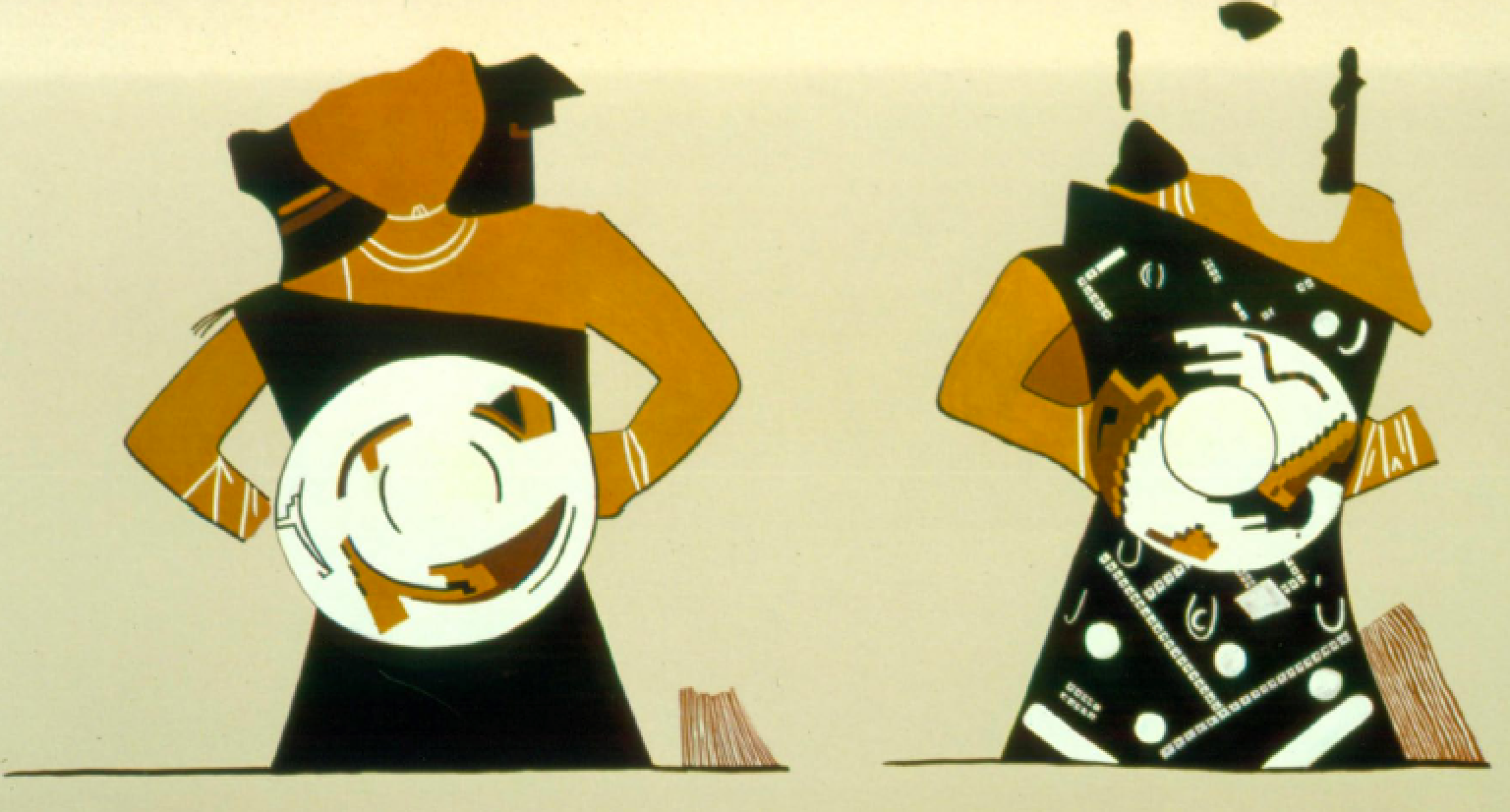
Pottery mound mural, unmarried girls. Kiva 16, Layer 1, East Wall. Reconstruction by Frank Hibben.

Pottery Mound (LA 416) was a late prehistoric village on the bank of the Rio Puerco, west of Los Lunas, New Mexico. It was an adobe pueblo most likely occupied between 1350 and 1500. The site is best known for its 17 kivas, which yielded a large number of murals. A 2007 book, New Perspectives on Pottery Mound Pueblo (Polly Schaafsma 2007) provides a general introduction to the site.

== Research History ==
Frank Hibben, a professor at the University of New Mexico (UNM) directed archaeological field schools at the site in 1954 (Ballagh and Phillips 2006), 1955, 1957, and 1958. He also directed a research project funded by the National Science Foundation in 1960–1961 and afterwards led "salvage" digs conducted by volunteers, as late as the 1980s. The "salvage" digs were highly disturbing to the cultural site, leading to complete destruction of historic Pueblo kivas and pottery. The poor planning, excavating, and over-"archeological" study has proven to be far more destructive to the sites long-term health and has led to much scrutiny within the Pueblo community. In 1979, UNM anthropology professor Linda Cordell directed a surface sampling, mapping, and testing program at the site. In 2003 UNM began an effort to reorganize the site collections and publish detailed accounts of the fieldwork. In late 2012 UNM deeded the land comprising the "site" to the Isleta Pueblo.

== Pottery ==
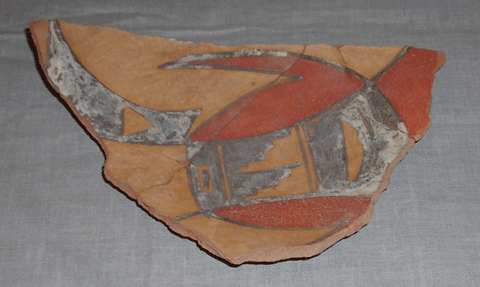
Pottery Mound Polychrome sherd

Pottery Mound is named after the large number of potsherds lying on the site surface, and after its low mound of melted adobe. The site was part of the Rio Grande Glaze Ware tradition that began ca. 1315 and continued until the time of the Spanish reconquest of New Mexico in 1693. The site's signature pottery, Pottery Mound Polychrome, includes red and black paint on a background consisting of two slip colors (on bowls, one slip color on the inside and the other on the outside). As is typical in the southern part of the glaze ware production area, Glaze A pottery (simple rim forms) predominates (Franklin 2007).

Pottery Mound has the greatest variety of pottery of any prehistoric site in central New Mexico. Imported pottery includes Hopi decorated and plain wares, white paste wares from the Acoma-Zuni region of west-central New Mexico, and biscuit wares from north-central New Mexico (Franklin 2007).
