= Borestone Mountain =

Mountain in Maine, United States

- Location within Maine

Highest point
- Elevation: East Peak 1,981 feet (604 m) West Peak 1,960 feet (597 m)
- Prominence: East Peak 972 feet (296 m) West Peak 40 feet (12 m)
- Coordinates: 45°22′37″N 69°24′14″W

Geography
- Location: Piscataquis County, Maine, U.S.

Climbing
- Easiest route: Simple Scrambling, class 2

Borestone Mountain is a mountain in Piscataquis County, Maine. It is a popular hiking spot near the center of the state, with a trailhead located on Mountain Road near Willimantic. The mountain is part of the Borestone Mountain Audubon Sanctuary There are several historic lodges on Midday Pond, run by Maine Audubon.

The trail is open to hikers 365 days a year. Parking is available on Mountain Road approximately 5 mi (8.0 km) north of Willimantic. The well-marked, well-maintained trail passes to the south and east of Midday Pond ascending the west side of the mountain. Directly to the south of Midday pond on the trail is a small one-room cabin with a museum open from Memorial Day to Columbus Day. The distance from parking to the summit is about 3 mi (4.8 km). The last part of the trail is very steep with sharp rocks with iron rungs to assist hikers. The East Peak offers a spectacular 360-degree view extending from the Penobscot River to the east, to the western Maine mountains and the Quebec border to the west.
