= Lionel Stevenson =

North American writer and lecturer

Arthur Lionel Stevenson FRSL (1902–1973) was a North American writer and lecturer. A leading authority on the literature of the Victorian period, he published biographies of William Makepeace Thackeray and George Meredith as well as a panoramic study of the English novel. He was James B. Duke Professor of English Literature at Duke University from 1955 until 1972.

== Birth, family and education ==
Lionel Stevenson was born in Edinburgh on 16 July 1902 and was the only child of Henry and Mabel Rose Stevenson. His mother and his paternal grandmother were both members of the Cary family, decayed Anglo-Irish gentry, and Lionel was both a first and a second cousin of the novelist Joyce Cary. (Note: He was also the nephew of Joyce Cary's stepmother, Dora Stevenson: Malcolm Fraser, Joyce Cary, a biography, Michael Joseph, London, 1969, p.46. Lionel Stevenson's volume in The History of the English Novel series devotes fourteen pages to consideration of Cary's literary work. In 1951 he presided when Cary addressed 200 teachers from colleges and universities in California on "The Modern Novel": San Bernardino Daily Sun, 7 March 1951, p. 9.)

In September 1907 Henry and Mabel Stevenson emigrated to Duncan, British Columbia, hoping Henry might there recover from declining health, but he died within three months of arrival. The residual Stevenson household included and was largely supported by Mabel's brother, George Cary, and in 1918 they removed to Vancouver so that Lionel (then known as Leo, which he came to dislike) could attend the University of British Columbia. He graduated there in 1922, obtained a master's degree from the University of Toronto in the following year, and in 1925 received his PhD from the University of California at Berkeley.

== First appointments and further study ==
Stevenson was appointed an instructor at Berkeley following the award of his doctorate, and in 1930 he accepted a position as professor and chairman of the English department at Arizona State Teachers College, becoming a naturalised American citizen in the same year. In 1933, at the depth of the Great Depression, the State of Arizona was bankrupt and the college was unable to pay its staff in hard currency. Stevenson took the opportunity for further study and obtained a place at the University of Oxford where, as a student of St Catherine's, he proceeded to a BLitt degree in 1935, submitting a thesis on Sydney, Lady Morgan, and being examined by Edmund Blunden and C. S. Lewis.

On returning to America, he spent two further years at Arizona State College before joining the University of Southern California as assistant professor of English in 1937.

== Early publications ==
In 1926 he published a slim volume of his own verse, A Pool of Stars, (Note: Another slim volume, The Rose of the Sea, appeared in 1932. Stevenson may have been first drawn to poetry by his mother's compositions: although she "had very bad eyesight and found writing almost impossible" she had authored numerous verses, of which a selection was published in Daughter of Donegal, Los Angeles, 1945: Stevenson, "From Inishowen to Oxford" in Joyce Cary Remembered (comp. and ed. Barbara Fisher), Barnes & Noble, New York, 1988, p. 61; Hollywood Citizen-News, Los Angeles, 30 August 1948, p. 11.) and a substantial treatise on Canada's poetry and prose, Appraisals of Canadian Literature. (Note: He had rehearsed some of the substance of Appraisals in his articles for the Canadian Bookman, notably "Manifesto for a National Literature", February 1924, p. 46, and had touched on the subject in "The Significance of Canadian Literature" which appeared in the University of California Chronicle, No. 27 (January 1925), pp. 33-42. His several contributions to the Bookman are noticed by Colin Hill in "Canadian Bookman and the Origin of Modern Realism in English-Canadian Fiction", Canadian Literature, No. 195 (Winter 2007), pp. 96-98.) The latter was well received and for many years regarded as the leading study in its field, Stevenson's "perceptive observations" anticipating those of Northrop Frye. He believed Canadian literature was at an early phase of evolution, saying it had yielded no great novels or plays because these were sophisticated forms driven by the intricacies of social relations, whereas the nation's poetry had flowered as a result of his countrymen's "genuine communion with nature in her pristine power, where civilization has never intruded her confusions".

It has been suggested that Appraisals was influenced in part by Stevenson's religious interest. He had been a member of the Toronto Theosophical Society from its foundation in 1924, and the impact of Darwinism on literature (whereby, in Stevenson's words, "Man became a mere product of the same forces which had shaped the rest of the Cosmos") became central to his thought and work during the 1920s.

His doctoral dissertation at Berkeley, "The Reflection of the Evolutionary Theory in English Poetry", attempted the first comprehensive scholarly assessment of poetic engagement with the theory of evolution and, as extensively revised by him, was published under the title Darwin Among the Poets in 1932. Stevenson noted that Browning and Tennyson "startlingly anticipated the evolutionary theory in their early poems, only to shrink from its later developments", whereas George Meredith "had little perception of the idea till the scientists announced it" but then "devoted himself to it unstintingly". The book, characterised as "a summary of poetic philosophy in England for the past hundred years", was immediately influential and "helped shape the interdisciplinary field of science and poetry".

His Oxford thesis on Lady Morgan also appeared in print (entitled, after Morgan's own novel, The Wild Irish Girl) in 1936. It was the first in a succession of in-depth biographical studies for which Stevenson was probably best known by the time of his death thirty-seven years later.

== Academic career ==
At Southern California he was made an associate professor in 1941 and promoted to professor in 1944. In 1955 he accepted appointment as James B. Duke Professor of English Literature at Duke University, remaining in this role until 1972 (when made professor emeritus) and serving as chair of the university's English Department from 1964 to 1967.

Following retirement from Duke he became visiting professor at the University of Houston (1973), having previously held visiting professorships at the Universities of Illinois (1952–53) and New York (1967–68) and a visiting lectureship at Oxford (1960–61). He had also taught in the summer sessions at San Francisco State College and the University of Colorado.

His lectures often contained a touch of drama, in the form of his graphic readings of poetry, and he strongly encouraged those students intending to become teachers to perform in plays in order to develop good voices. He himself sometimes appeared in dramatic performances staged by the Dickens Fellowship. (Note: By way of example, in a 1929 Dickens Fellowship local group's dramatisation of a scene from David Copperfield, Stevenson took the role of Uriah Heap while his mother played Mrs Heap: Oakland Tribune, 13 November 1929, p. 27.)

== Later publications ==
During his time at Southern California and Duke he was energetic in research and prolific in authorship. He wrote biographies of Charles Lever, of William Makepeace Thackeray and, in what was described as a "grand-scale resurrection of Victorian literature's most neglected writer", of George Meredith. He produced a comprehensive account of the Pre-Raphaelite Poets, was co-author of a detailed survey of Victorian English Literature, and wrote a chronological examination of English prose fiction from the sixteenth to the mid-twentieth century. This last, in the opinion of reviewer Garry Hogg, rendered it "impossible ever again to read a work of fiction without a deeper, richer insight".

Between 1937 and 1973 he contributed more than forty critical and research articles (in addition to numerous reviews and brief notes) to scholarly journals, several such pieces being republished in hard-back anthologies. He wrote introductions for reprints of novels by Thackeray, Meredith, John Galsworthy and George Moore, compiled the first published version of Victorian Fiction: A Guide to Research, and contributed to Encyclopedia Americana and other leading works of reference.

He was president of Dickens Fellowship branches in California, wrote for the Fellowship's journal from 1926 onward, and briefly edited the Dickens Studies Newsletter. His 1943 Sewanee Review article on what he called "Dickens's Dark Novels" exposed the combination of external political forces and personal crises that had beset their author, adding momentum to the revolution in Dickens studies which Edmund Wilson had set in motion some years earlier.

== Other work in the field of literature ==
He sat on the editorial boards of many leading professional publications (Note: Of his service (1949–73) on the advisory board of Nineteenth Century Fiction, its editor Professor G. B. Tennyson wrote: "His counsel throughout the years was indispensable. His evaluations were, like Lionel himself, always judicious and yet always kind. We believe our journal has been greatly strengthened by his association with it": "Lionel Stevenson 1902-1973", Nineteenth Century Fiction, Vol. 29, Issue 1 (June 1974), pp. 93-94.) and was a member of more than a dozen literary organisations and societies, some of which he represented at international conventions. He was president of the California Writers Club in 1928–30, chair of the Victorian literature section of the Modern Language Association in 1959, and American chair of the Modern Humanities Research Association in 1968–72.

He chaired the editorial committee of the Borestone Mountain Poetry Awards for twenty-five years, each year reading hundreds of poems in order to help select those for inclusion in the Awards' annual Best Poems compilation. He was first vice-president of the California Federation of Chaparral Poets from 1944 but wrote little poetry in his later years, and then only for private circulation. Nevertheless, he was, at his death, described by Charles D. Perlee (Chairman of the California Fine Arts and Humanities Study Committee) as "one of America's finest poets".

== Awards and distinctions ==
His book on the Pre-Raphaelites, which was said to "reaffirm his eminence in the very first rank of Victorian Scholars", won the Mayflower Cup for the outstanding non-fiction work of 1973. He was elected a Fellow of the Royal Society of Literature in 1951 and a Guggenheim Fellow in 1960. (Note: The Fellowship was for the purpose of studying symbolic elements in English fiction from Meredith to Conrad: New York Times, 25 December 1973, p. 24.)

== Final appointment and death ==
In the autumn of 1973 he moved to Vancouver to take up appointment as the first Distinguished Professor of English at his alma mater, the University of British Columbia, for the academic year 1973–4. He was due to deliver the Garnett Sedgwick Memorial Lecture there when he died suddenly on 21 December 1973.

== Tributes and legacy ==
When Stevenson died, his immediate successor as James B. Duke Professor, Louis J. Budd, declared that "as a biographer of Victorian novelists and as historian of the English novel he had no peer" — an assessment promptly endorsed in World Literature Written in English. A later successor at Duke, Clyde de Loache Ryals, recalling Stevenson's celebration of Victorian literature at a time when it was generally deprecated, described him as "one of the founders of Victorian studies" whose pioneering efforts by teaching and writing "revealed the vast body of Victorian literature as one of the glories of the English language" and contributed to the popularity which Victorian prose and poetry continued to enjoy after his death.

Stevenson left his lifetime collection of books, papers and letters (with correspondents as diverse as Daphne du Maurier and Albert Einstein) to Duke University: the collection comprises some 33,300 items, including important articles of Canadiana.

== Personal life ==
In 1954 Stevenson married Lillian Sprague Jones. She brought him a stepdaughter, Marietta, whose later academic and professional success was a source of great pleasure for him. As his widow Lillian married Dr Thomas Clark Pollock, formerly Professor of English and Head of the English Department at New York University, in 1975. She died, again a widow, in 2003.

== Principal works ==
A full bibliography for Stevenson appears in the volume of essays written in honour of Stevenson on his retirement from Duke University. The following may be regarded as his principal works:

- A Pool of Stars (poetry), Ryerson Press, Toronto, 1926
- Appraisals of Canadian Literature, The Macmillan Company of Canada, Toronto, 1926
- The Rose of the Sea (poetry), Ryerson Press, Toronto, 1932
- Darwin Among the Poets, Chicago University Press, Chicago, 1932
- The Wild Irish Girl: the Life of Sydney Owenson, Lady Morgan (1776–1859), Chapman & Hall, London, 1936
- Dr Quicksilver: the Life of Charles Lever, Chapman & Hall, London, 1939
- The Showman of Vanity Fair: the Life of William Makepeace Thackeray, Charles Scribner's Sons, New York, 1947
- (with John D. Cooke) English Literature of the Victorian Period, Appleton-Century-Crofts, New York, 1949
- The Ordeal of George Meredith, a Biography, Charles Scribner's Sons, New York, 1953
- The English Novel: A Panorama, Houghton Mifflin Company, Boston, 1960
- The History of the English Novel, Vol. XI, Yesterday and After, Barnes & Noble, New York, 1967
- The Pre-Raphaelite Poets, University of North Carolina Press, Chapel Hill, 1972
