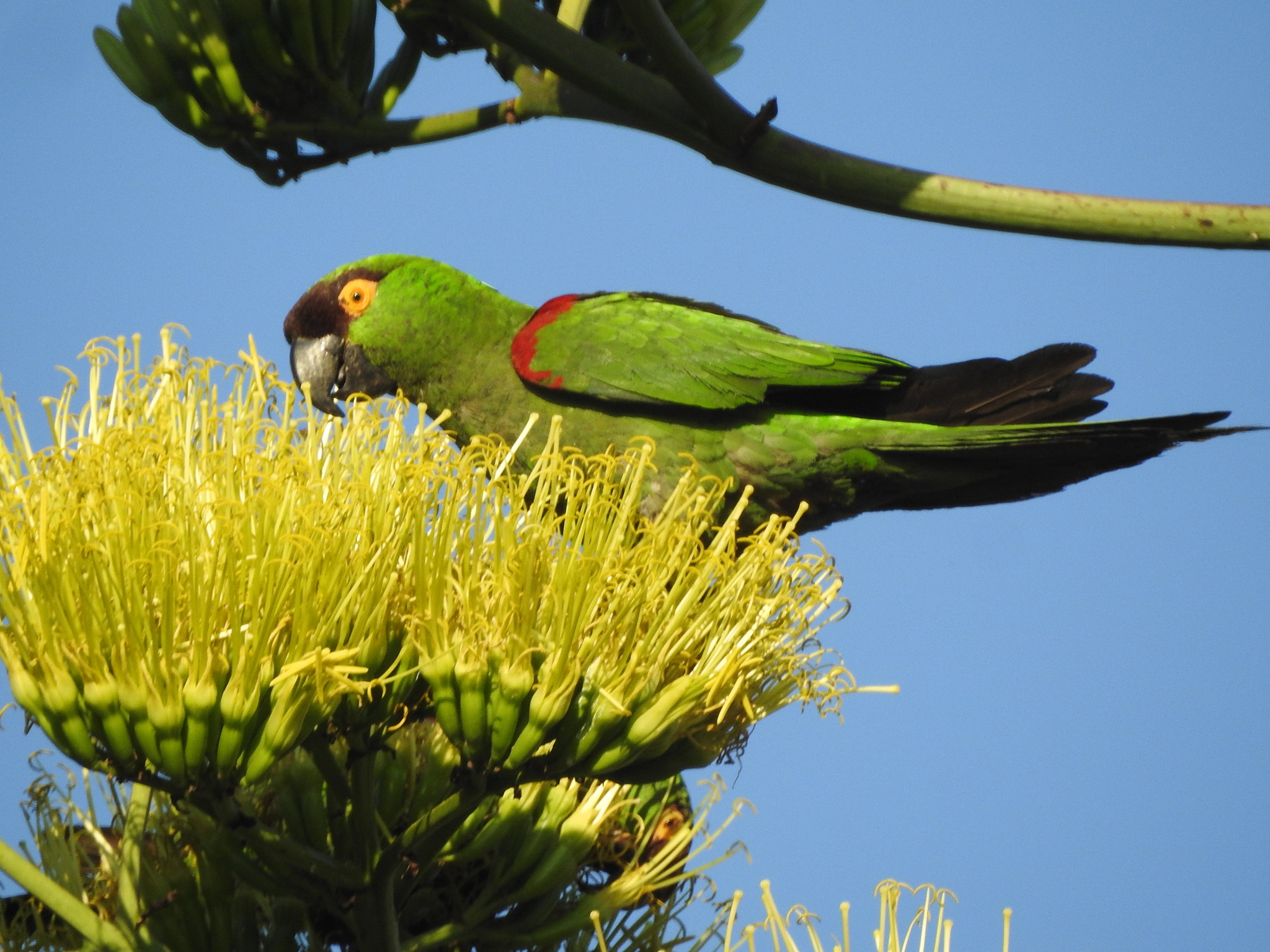

Conservation status
- Endangered (IUCN 3.1)
- CITES Appendix I

Scientific classification
- Kingdom: Animalia
- Phylum: Chordata
- Class: Aves
- Order: Psittaciformes
- Family: Psittacidae
- Genus: Rhynchopsitta
- Species: R. terrisi

Binomial name
- Rhynchopsitta terrisi R.T. Moore, 1947

= Maroon-fronted parrot =

Species of bird

The maroon-fronted parrot (Rhynchopsitta terrisi) is a large, macaw-like parrot. It is dark green with a dark red shoulder and a maroon forehead and eye-stripe. Its underside of the wings and tail appear to be black when it is in flight. It makes a high, rolling cr-a ak sound. Groups sound similar to the acorn woodpecker if they are heard from a distance.

The species is endemic to northeastern Mexico, where only about 2500–3000 birds survive in the wild.

== Taxonomy ==
R. terrisi is one of two extant and one extinct species of genus Rhynchopsitta of thick-billed parrots.

== Description ==
The maroon-fronted parrot is a large mostly green parrot which measures 40–45 cm (16–18 in) in length and weighs 390–470 g (14–17 oz). The adults have a dark maroon brow which extends over the rim of bare yellow skin that surrounds the eyes. They have a brighter red at the bend of the wing. The tail is long and pointed. The underside of the wings are blackish. The juvenile has a pale beak, whitish eye-rings, and lack the dark maroon stripe over each eye.

== Distribution and habitat ==
Maroon-fronted parrots live in mature pine, mixed conifer, and pine-oak forests from 2000 to 3500 meters. This bird is endemic to the Sierra Madre Oriental in Nuevo León, Coahuila and Tamaulipas, Mexico.

== Behaviour ==
They nest in limestone cliffs near moving water in large colonies. Breeding coincides with the fruition of pines, which is its main food source. They lay one to three eggs in July and the juveniles fledge around November. They migrate over short distances seasonally.

== Conservation ==
This bird is considered endangered due to overgrazing and habitat destruction.

The ITESM Campus Monterrey carry out environmental education programs and science research in Cumbres de Monterrey National Park and Sierra de Arteaga for the conservation of maroon-fronted parrots.
