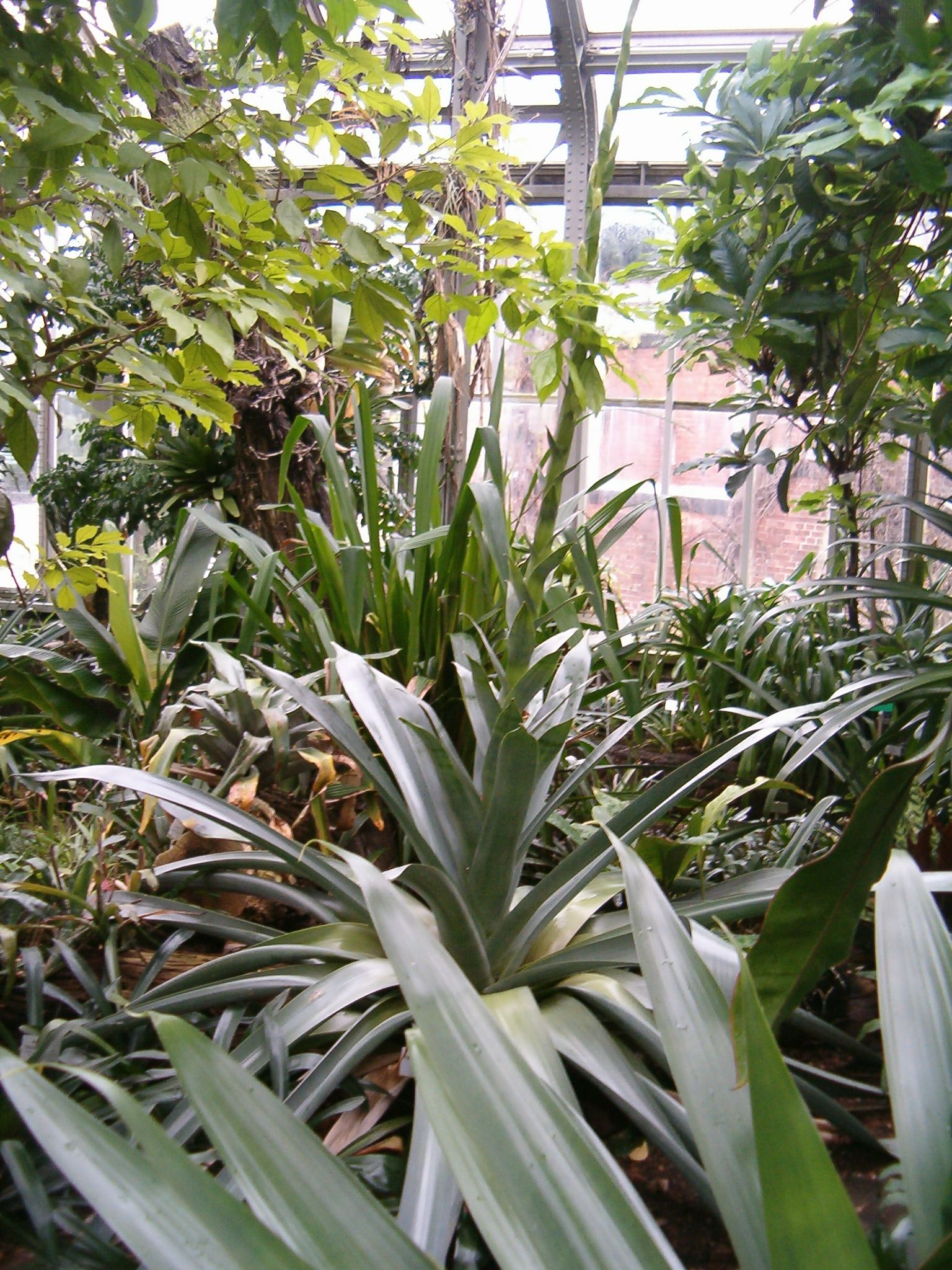

Scientific classification
- Kingdom: Plantae
- Clade: Tracheophytes
- Clade: Angiosperms
- Clade: Monocots
- Clade: Commelinids
- Order: Poales
- Family: Bromeliaceae
- Subfamily: Tillandsioideae
- Genus: Pseudalcantarea
- Species: P. grandis

Binomial name
- Pseudalcantarea grandis (Schltdl.) Pinzón & Barfuss

Synonyms
- Tillandsia grandis Schltdl.

= Pseudalcantarea grandis =

Species of plant

Pseudalcantarea grandis, synonym Tillandsia grandis, is a species of flowering plant in the family Bromeliaceae. This species is native to Mexico, Guatemala, and Honduras, particularly in areas such as Veracruz, Oaxaca, Puebla, and Queretaro, at elevations ranging from 1,000 to 1,700 meters .

This species is notable for its impressive size and longevity. In its native habitat, it may not flower until it is 20 to 25 years old . P. grandis is typically lithophytic, growing on steep rock faces, though it also adapts to pot culture in cultivation.

The plant's taxonomy has evolved over time. Initially classified under the genus Tillandsia, it was reclassified to the genus Pseudalcantarea in 2016 based on molecular and morphological studies .
