= Cipuropsis =

Scientific classification
- Kingdom: Plantae
- Clade: Tracheophytes
- Clade: Angiosperms
- Clade: Monocots
- Clade: Commelinids
- Order: Poales
- Family: Bromeliaceae
- Subfamily: Tillandsioideae
- Genus: Cipuropsis; Ule

Species
- See text.

Synonyms
- See text.

Genus of flowering plants

Cipuropsis is a genus of flowering plant in the family Bromeliaceae, native to the Caribbean, southern Central America and northwestern South America. The genus was first described by Ule in 1907.

== Taxonomy ==
As of October 2022, different circumscriptions of the genus are in use. In the narrow sense, the segregate genera Josemania and Mezobromelia are recognized; in the broad sense, these are sunk into Cipuropsis. Species accepted by the Encyclopedia of Bromeliads using the narrow sense are:

- Cipuropsis amicorum (I.Ramírez & Bevil.) Gouda
- Cipuropsis asmussii Gouda
- Cipuropsis subandina Ule

Additional species accepted by Plants of the World Online using the broad sense are listed below, together with placements in Josemania and Mezobromelia.

- Cipuropsis asplundii (L.B.Sm.) Christenh. & Byng = Josemania asplundii (L.B.Sm.) W.Till & Barfuss
- Cipuropsis bicolor (L.B.Sm.) Christenh. & Byng = Mezobromelia bicolor L.B.Sm.
- Cipuropsis capituligera (Griseb.) Christenh. & Byng = Mezobromelia capituligera (Griseb.) J.R.Grant
- Cipuropsis delicatula (L.B.Sm.) Christenh. & Byng = Josemania delicatula (L.B.Sm.) W.Till & Barfuss
- Cipuropsis hospitalis (L.B.Sm.) Christenh. & Byng = Mezobromelia hospitalis (L.B.Sm.) J.R.Grant
- Cipuropsis magdalenae (L.B.Sm.) Christenh. & Byng = Mezobromelia magdalenae (L.B.Sm.) J.R.Grant
- Cipuropsis pinnata (Mez & Sodiro) Christenh. & Byng = Josemania pinnata (Mez & Sodiro) W.Till & Barfuss
- Cipuropsis singularis (Mez & Wercklé) Christenh. & Byng = Josemania singularis (Mez & Wercklé) W.Till & Barfuss
- Cipuropsis truncata (L.B.Sm.) Christenh. & Byng = Josemania truncata (L.B.Sm.) W.Till & Barfuss
