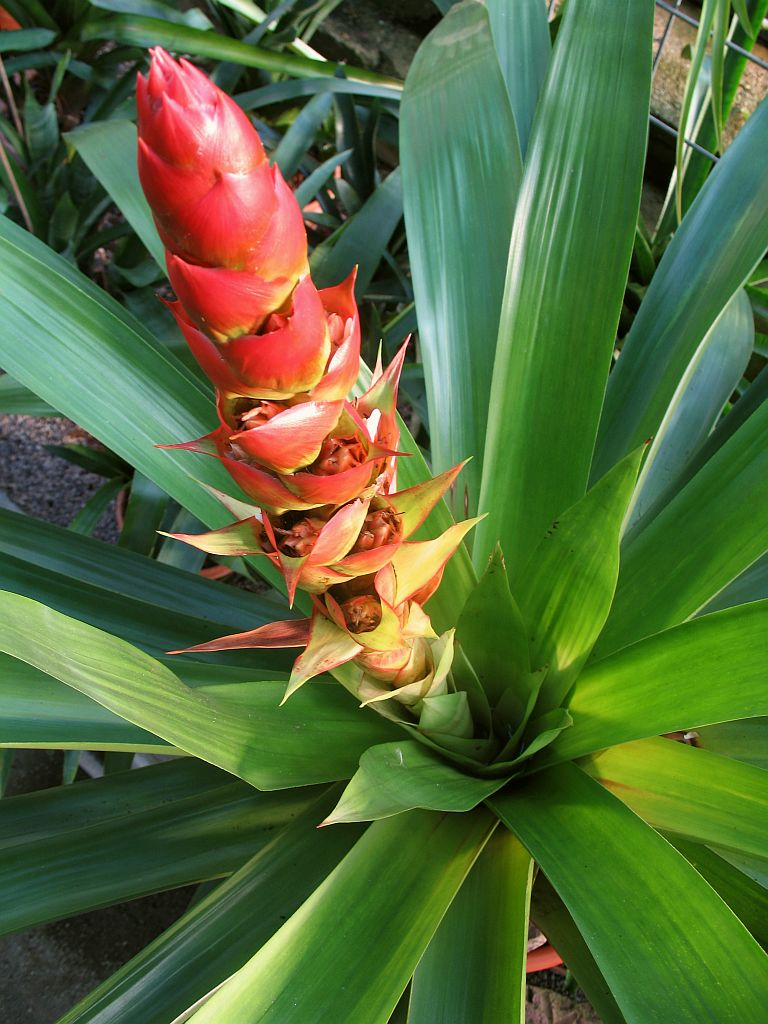
- Mezobromelia capituligera

Scientific classification
- Kingdom: Plantae
- Clade: Tracheophytes
- Clade: Angiosperms
- Clade: Monocots
- Clade: Commelinids
- Order: Poales
- Family: Bromeliaceae
- Subfamily: Tillandsioideae
- Genus: Mezobromelia; L.B.Smith

= Mezobromelia =

Genus of flowering plants

Mezobromelia is a genus of the botanical family Bromeliaceae, subfamily Tillandsioideae. The genus name is for Carl Christian Mez, German botanist (1866-1944). Some authorities treat Mezobromelia as a synonym of Cipuropsis.

The species of this genus are rare in cultivation. They are native to the West Indies and northern South America.

== Species ==
Six species are currently recognised:

- Mezobromelia bicolor L.B. Smith – Colombia, Ecuador
- Mezobromelia capituligera (Grisebach) J.R. Grant – West Indies (Cuba, Hispaniola, Jamaica, Trinidad, Leeward Islands), South America (Venezuela, Colombia, Ecuador, Peru)
- Mezobromelia hospitalis (L.B. Smith) J.R. Grant – Colombia
- Mezobromelia magdalenae (L.B. Smith) J.R. Grant – Colombia
- Mezobromelia pleiosticha (Grisebach) Utley & H.Luther
- Mezobromelia verecunda (L.B.Sm.) Gouda

Species transferred to Gregbrownia:

- Mezobromelia brownii H. Luther = Gregbrownia brownii – Ecuador
- Mezobromelia fulgens L.B. Smith = Gregbrownia fulgens – Ecuador
- Mezobromelia hutchisonii (L.B. Smith) W. Weber & L.B. Smith = Gregbrownia hutchisonii – Peru
- Mezobromelia lyman-smithii Rauh & Barthlott = Gregbrownia lyman-smithii – Ecuador
