= Water clarity =

How deeply visible light penetrates through water

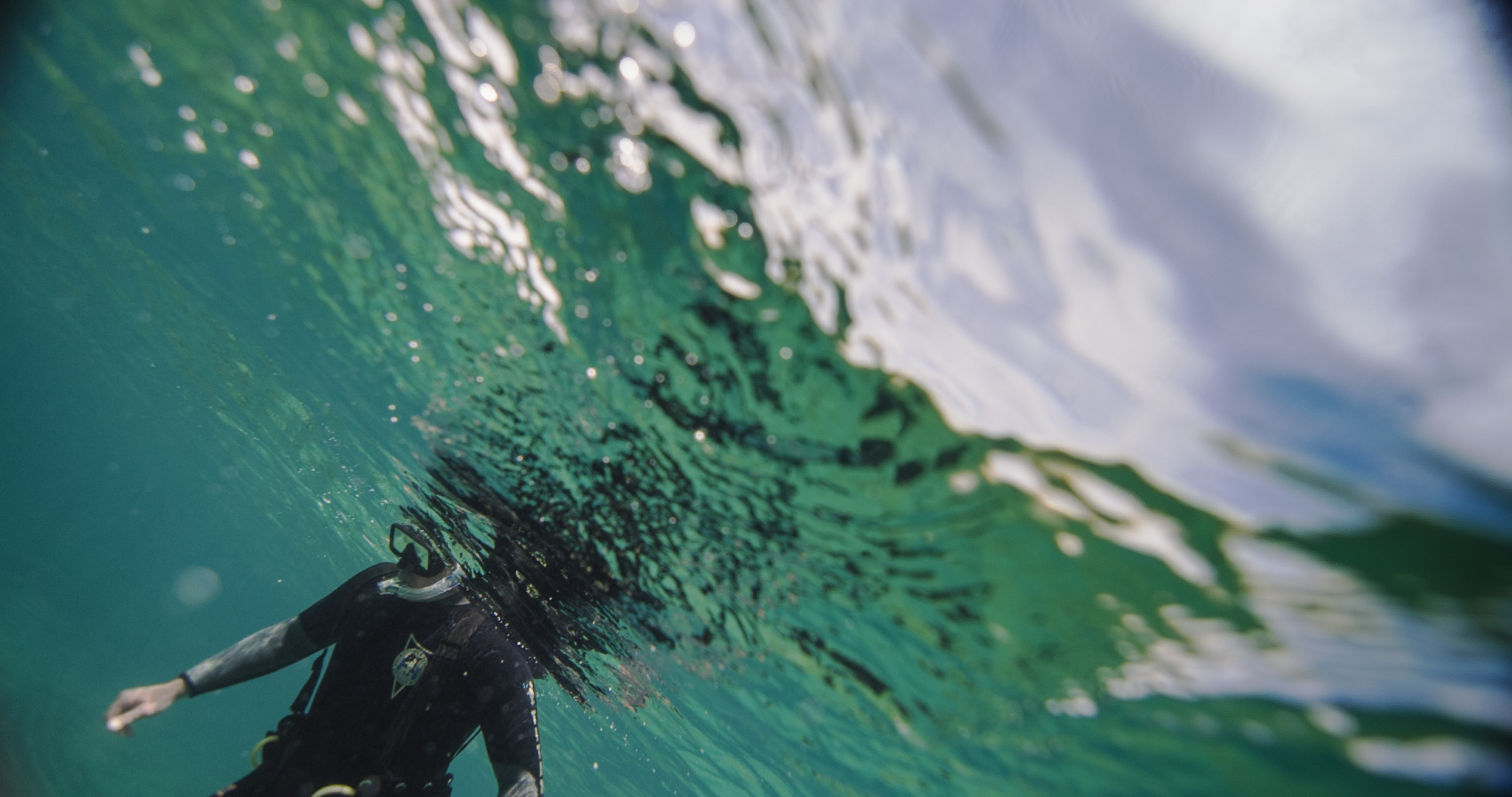
A diver enters crystal-clear water in Lake Huron.

Water clarity is the qualitative property of how deeply visible light penetrates water. In addition to light penetration, the term water clarity is also often used to describe underwater visibility. Water clarity is one way that humans measure water quality, along with oxygen concentration and the presence or absence of pollutants and algal blooms.

Water clarity governs the health of underwater ecosystems because it impacts the amount of light reaching the plants and animals living underwater. For plants, light is needed for photosynthesis. The clarity of the underwater environment determines the depth ranges where aquatic plants can live. Water clarity also impacts how well visual animals like fish can see their prey. Clarity affects the aquatic plants and animals living in all kinds of water bodies, including rivers, ponds, lakes, reservoirs, estuaries, coastal lagoons, and the open ocean.

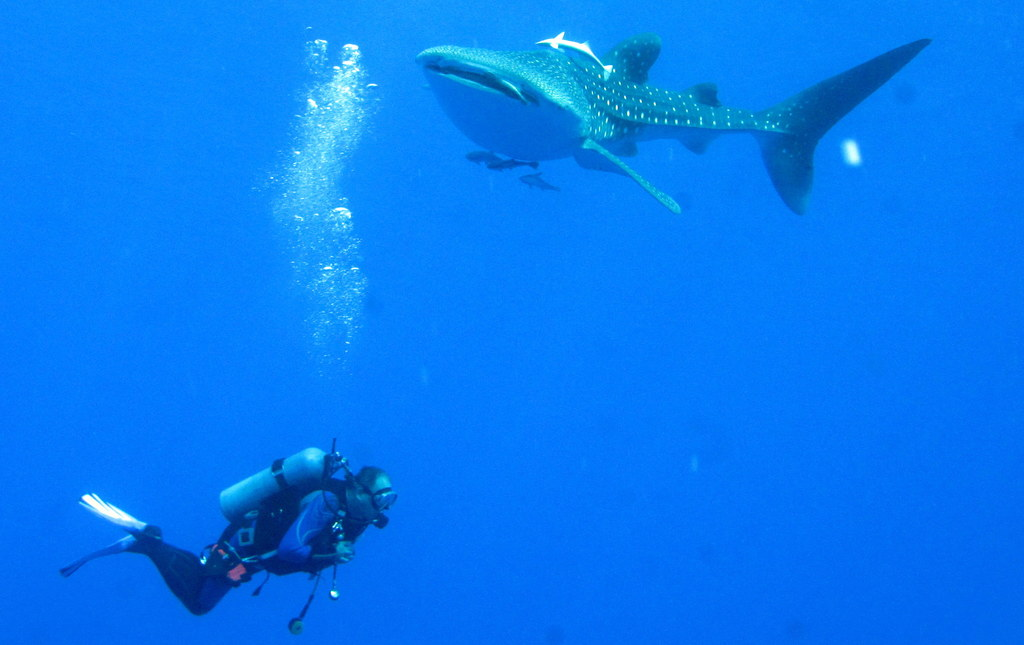
Clear water with high visibility at Daedalus Reef, Egypt

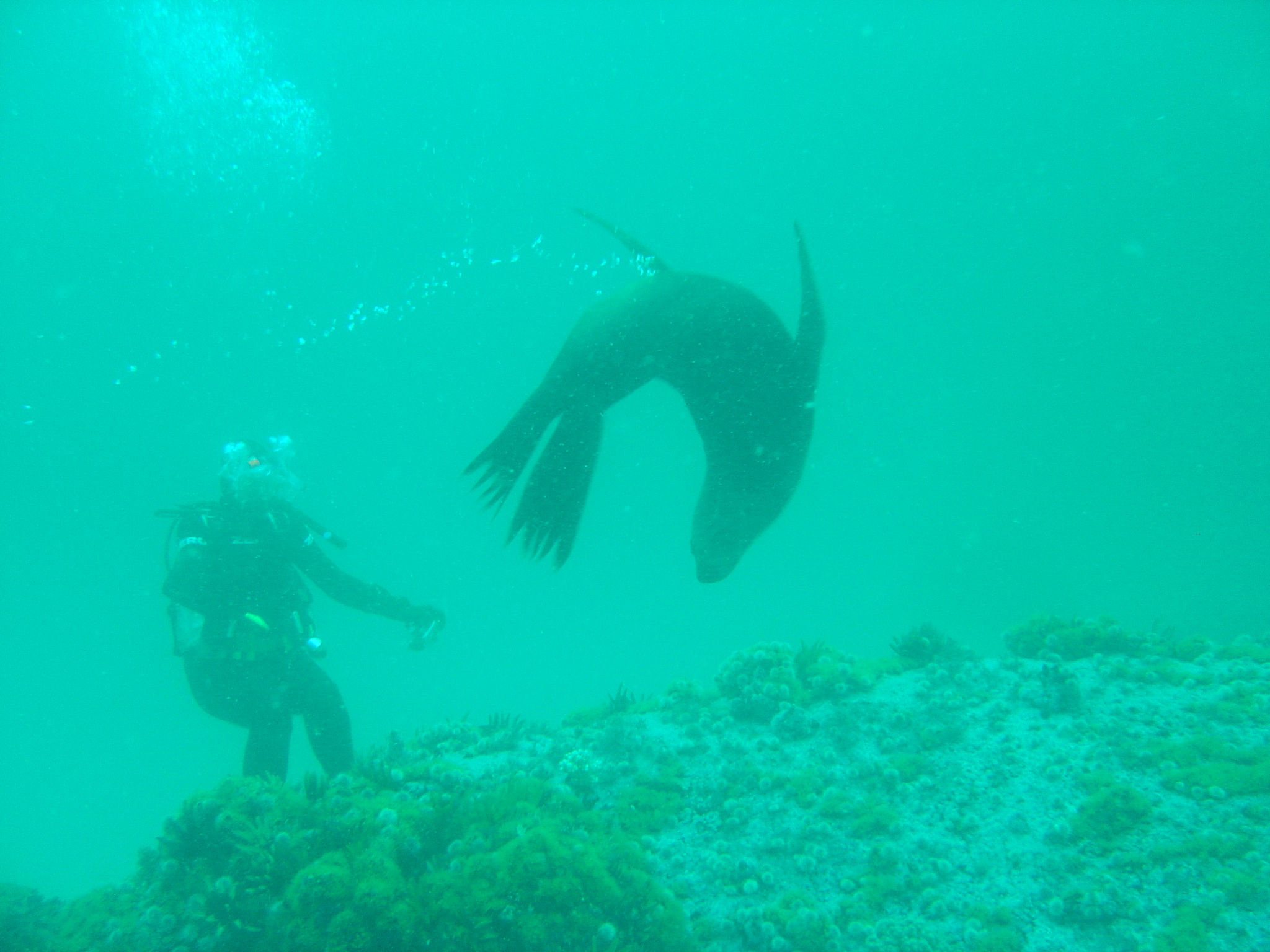
More turbid water with lower visibility near Castle Rocks, South Africa

Water clarity also affects how humans interact with water, from recreation and property values to mapping, defense, and security. Water clarity influences human perceptions of water quality, recreational safety, aesthetic appeal, and overall environmental health. Tourists visiting the Great Barrier Reef were willing to pay to improve the water clarity conditions for recreational satisfaction. Water clarity also influences waterfront property values. In the United States, a 1% improvement in water clarity increased property values by up to 10%. Water clarity is needed to visualize targets underwater, either from above or in water. These applications include mapping and military operations. To map shallow-water features such as oyster reefs and seagrass beds, the water must be clear enough for those features to be visible to a drone, airplane, or satellite. Water clarity is also needed to detect underwater objects such as submarines using visible light.

== Water clarity measurements ==
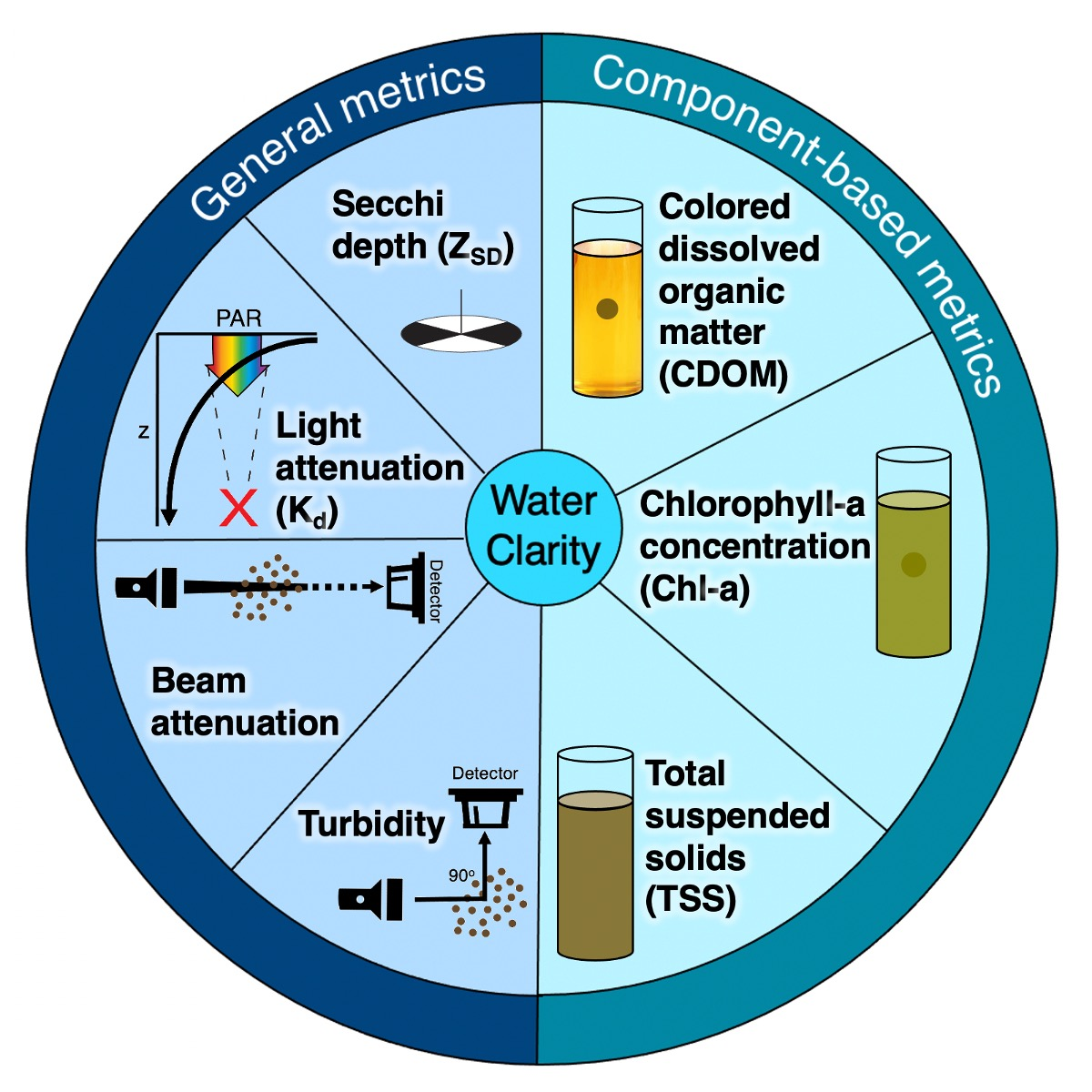
Metrics used to measure water clarity.

Water clarity is measured using multiple techniques. These measurements include: Secchi depth, light attenuation, turbidity, beam attenuation, absorption by colored dissolved organic matter, the concentration of chlorophyll-a pigment, and the concentration of total suspended solids. Clear water generally has a deep Secchi depth, low light attenuation (deeper light penetration), low turbidity, low beam attenuation, and low concentrations of dissolved substances, chlorophyll-a, and/or total suspended solids. More turbid water generally has a shallow Secchi depth, high light attenuation (less light penetration to depth), high turbidity, high beam attenuation, and high concentrations of dissolved substances, chlorophyll-a, and/or total suspended solids.

=== Overall general metrics ===
==== Secchi depth ====
Secchi depth is the depth at which a disk is no longer visible to the human eye. This measurement was created in 1865 and represents one of the oldest oceanographic methods. To measure Secchi depth, a white or black-and-white disk is mounted on a pole or line and lowered slowly down in the water. The depth at which the disk is no longer visible is taken as a measure of the transparency of the water. Secchi depth is most useful as a measure of transparency or underwater visibility.

==== Light attenuation ====
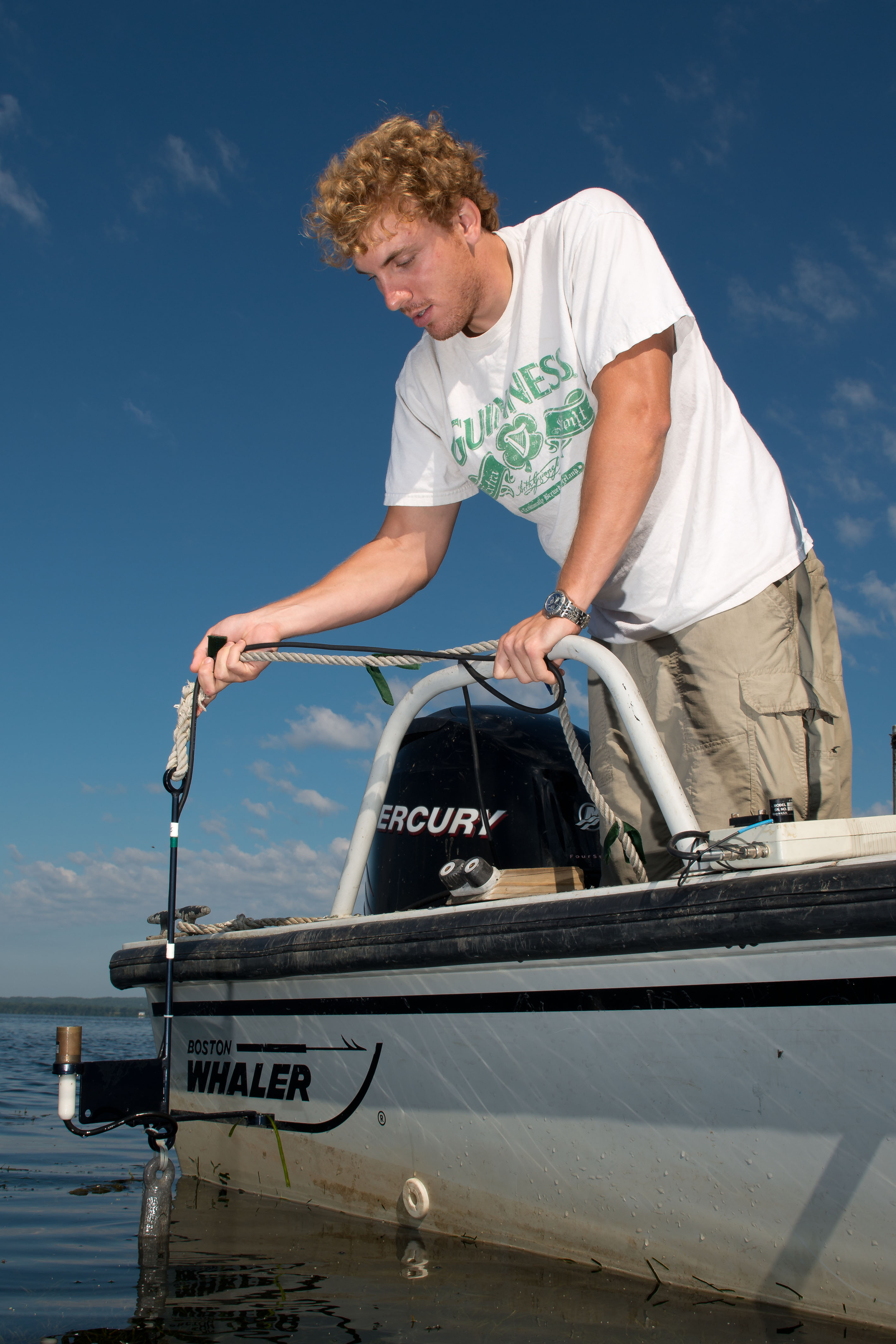
Measuring light attenuation, K_{d}(PAR), from a boat in the Chesapeake Bay. This is a measure of downwelling light attenuation using a flat sensor.

The light attenuation coefficient – often shortened to "light attenuation" – describes the decrease in solar irradiance with depth. To calculate this coefficient, light energy is measured at a series of depths from the surface to the depth of 1% illumination. Then, the exponential decline in light is calculated using Beer's Law with the equation:

${I_z \over I_0}= e^{-kz}$

where k is the light attenuation coefficient, I_{z} is the intensity of light at depth z, and I_{0} is the intensity of light at the ocean surface. Which translates to:

$k = {ln{I_z \over I_0} \over - z}$

This measurement can be done for specific colors of light or more broadly for all visible light. The light attenuation coefficient of photosynthetically active radiation (PAR) refers to the decrease in all visible light (400–700 nm) with depth. Light attenuation can be measured as the decrease in downwelling light (Kd) or the decrease in scalar light (Ko) with depth. Light attenuation is most useful as a measure of the total underwater light energy available to plants, such as phytoplankton and submerged aquatic vegetation.

==== Turbidity ====
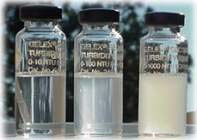
Three glass vials used as turbidity standards for 5, 50, and 500 nephelometric turbidity units (NTU).

Turbidity is a measure of the cloudiness of water based on light scattering by particles at a 90-degree angle to the detector. A turbidity sensor is placed in water with a light source and a detector at a 90-degree angle to one another. The light source is usually red or near-infrared light (600–900 nm). Turbidity sensors are also called turbidimeters or nephelometers. In more turbid water, more particles are present in the water, and more light scattering by particles is picked up by the detector. Turbidity is most useful for long-term monitoring because these sensors are often low cost and sturdy enough for long deployments underwater.

==== Beam attenuation ====
Beam attenuation is measured with a device called a transmissometer that has a light source at one end and a detector at the other end, in one plane. The amount of light transmitted to the detector through the water is the beam transmission, and the amount of light lost is the beam attenuation. Beam attenuation is essentially the opposite of light transmission. Clearer water with a low beam attenuation coefficient will have high light transmission, and more turbid water with a high beam attenuation coefficient will have low light transmission. Beam attenuation is used as a proxy for particulate organic carbon in oligotrophic waters like the open ocean.

=== Concentration-based metrics ===
==== Colored dissolved organic matter (CDOM) absorption ====
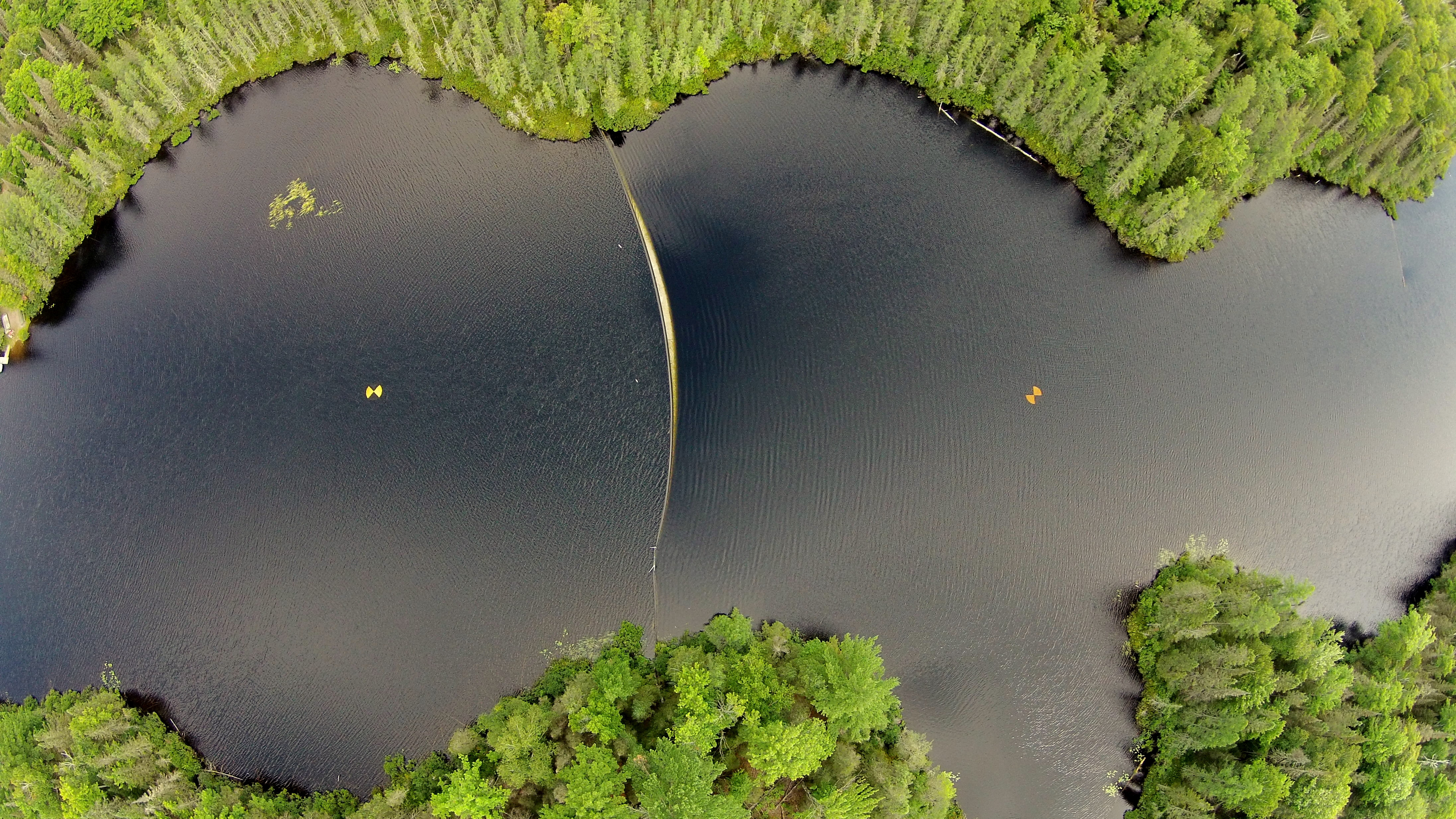
Darker colored water can be seen in the right half of this experiment in a lake, with the giant Secchi disk appearing more brown in color due to higher dissolved organic matter concentrations.

Colored dissolved organic matter (CDOM) absorbs light, making the water appear darker or tea-colored. Absorption by CDOM is one measure of water clarity. Clarity can still be quite high in terms of visibility with high amounts of CDOM in the water, but the color of the water will be altered to yellow or brown, and the water will appear darker than water with low CDOM concentrations. CDOM absorbs blue light more strongly than other colors, shifting the color of the water toward the yellow and red part of the visible light spectrum as the water gets darker. For example, in lakes with high CDOM concentrations, the bottom of the lake may be clearly visible to the human eye, but a white surface in the same lake water may appear yellow or brown.

==== Total suspended solids (TSS) concentration ====
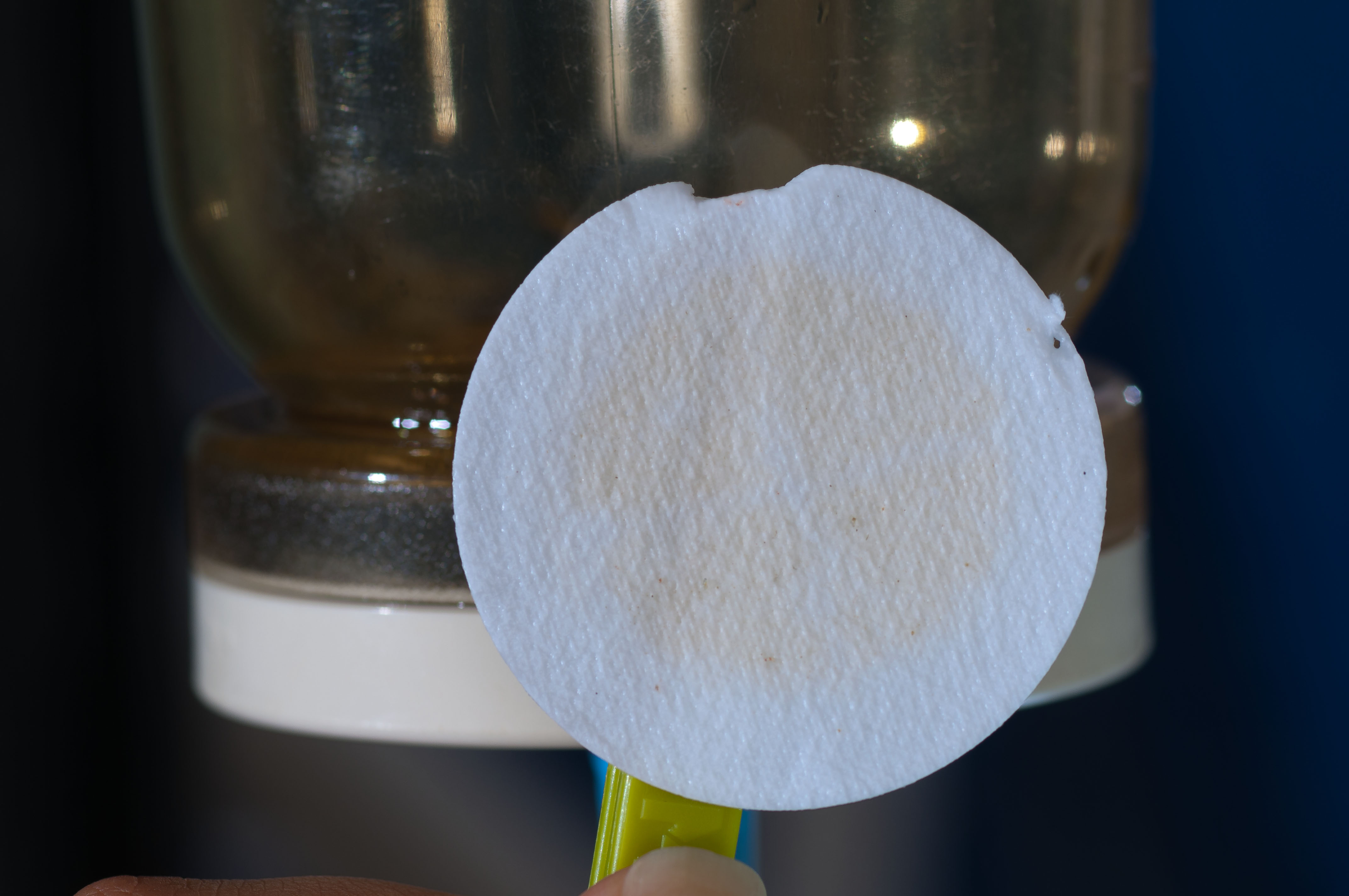
Total suspended solids concentration is measured by weighing a filter before and after filtering water through it to calculate the mass of material left on the filter.

Total suspended solids (TSS) concentration is the concentration (dry weight mass per unit volume of water) of all the material in water that is caught on a filter, usually a filter with about a 0.7 micrometer pore size. This includes all the particles suspended in water, such as mineral particles (silt, clay), organic detritus, and phytoplankton cells. Clear water bodies have low TSS concentrations. Other names for TSS include total suspended matter (TSM) and suspended particulate matter (SPM). The term suspended sediment concentration (SSC) refers to the mineral component of TSS but is sometimes used interchangeably with TSS. If desired, the concentrations of volatile (organic) and fixed (inorganic) suspended solids can be separated out using the loss-on-ignition method by burning the filter in a muffle furnace to burn off organic matter, leaving behind ash including mineral particles and inorganic components of phytoplankton cells, with TSS = volatile suspended solids + fixed suspended solids.

==== Chlorophyll-a concentration ====
Chlorophyll-a concentration is sometimes used to measure water clarity, especially when suspended sediments and colored dissolved organic matter concentrations are low. Chlorophyll-a concentration is a proxy for phytoplankton biomass, which is one way to quantify how turbid the water is due to biological primary production. Chlorophyll-a concentration is most useful for research on primary production, the contribution of phytoplankton to light attenuation, and harmful algal blooms. Chlorophyll-a concentration is also useful for long-term monitoring because these sensors are often low cost and sturdy enough for long deployments underwater.

== Case studies ==
=== High water clarity ===
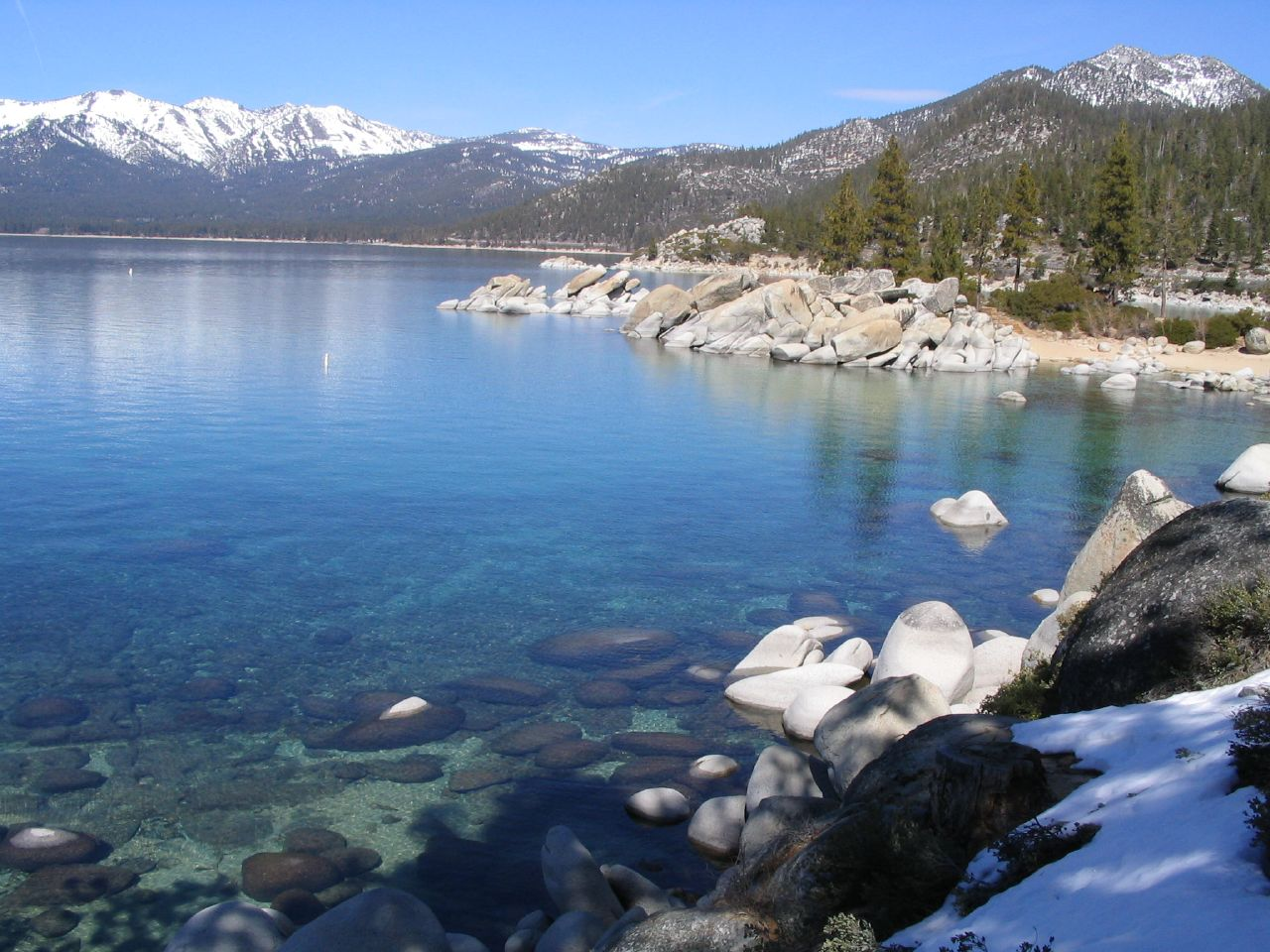
Clear water in Lake Tahoe, California, United States.

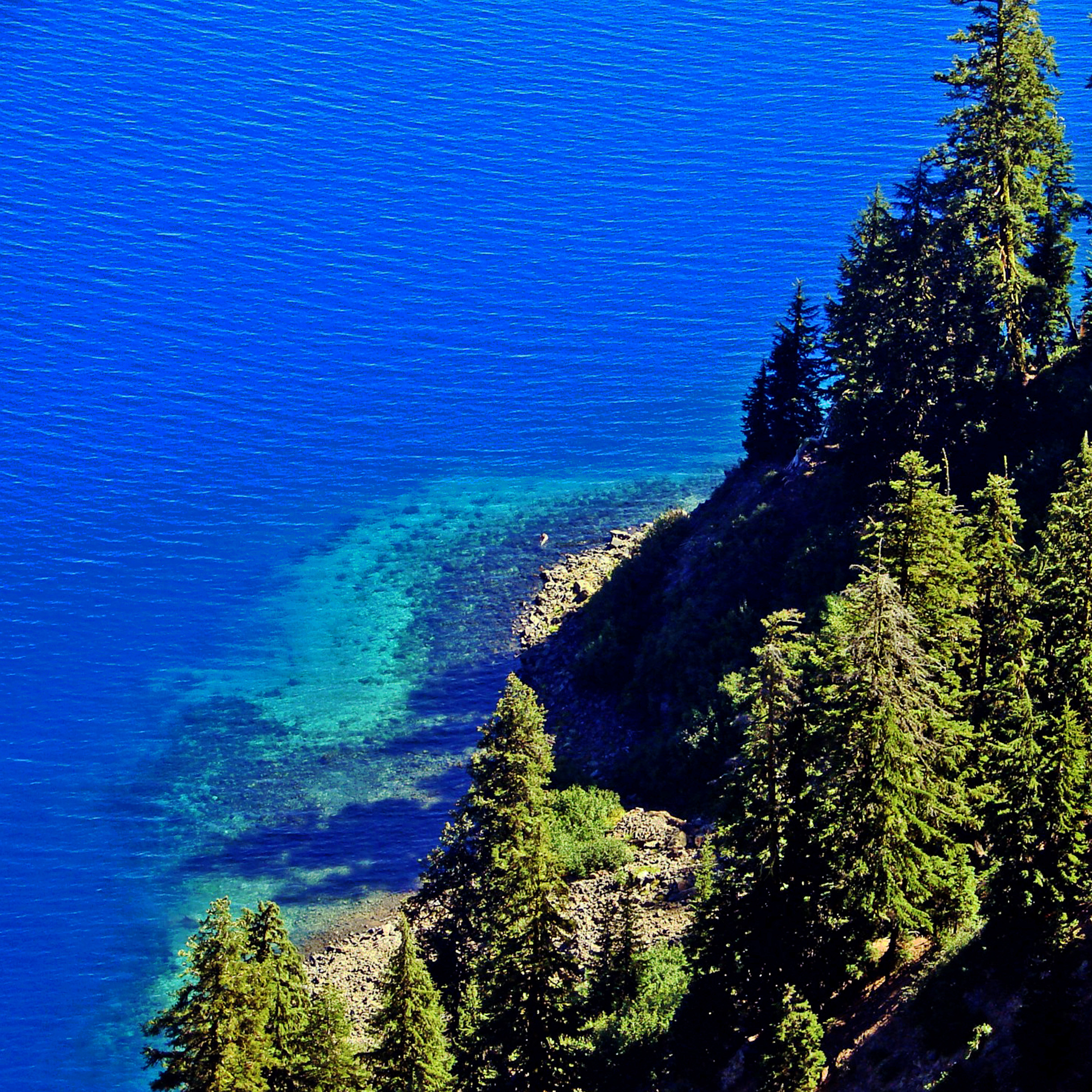
Clear water in Crater Lake, Oregon, United States.

The clearest waters occur in oligotrophic ocean regions such as the South Pacific Gyre, tropical coastal waters, glacially-formed lakes with low sediment inputs, and lakes with some kind of natural filtration occurring at the inflow point. Blue Lake in New Zealand holds the record for the highest water clarity of any lake, with a Secchi depth of 230 to 260 feet. Blue Lake is fed by an underground passage from a nearby lake, which acts as a natural filter. Some other very clear water bodies are Lake Tahoe between California and Nevada in the United States, Lake Baikal in Russia, and Crater Lake in Oregon in the United States.

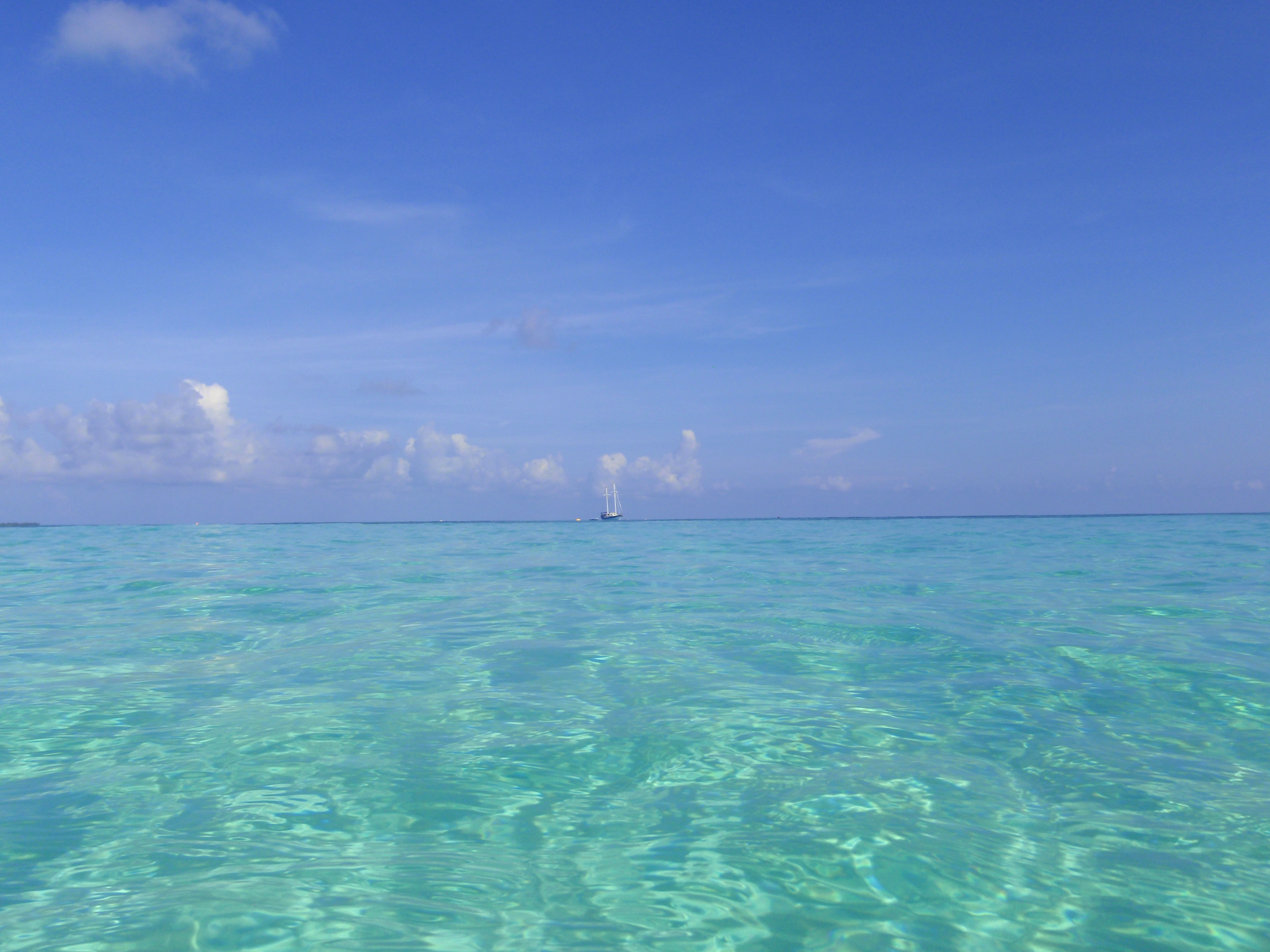
Clear water in the Maldives in the Indian Ocean.

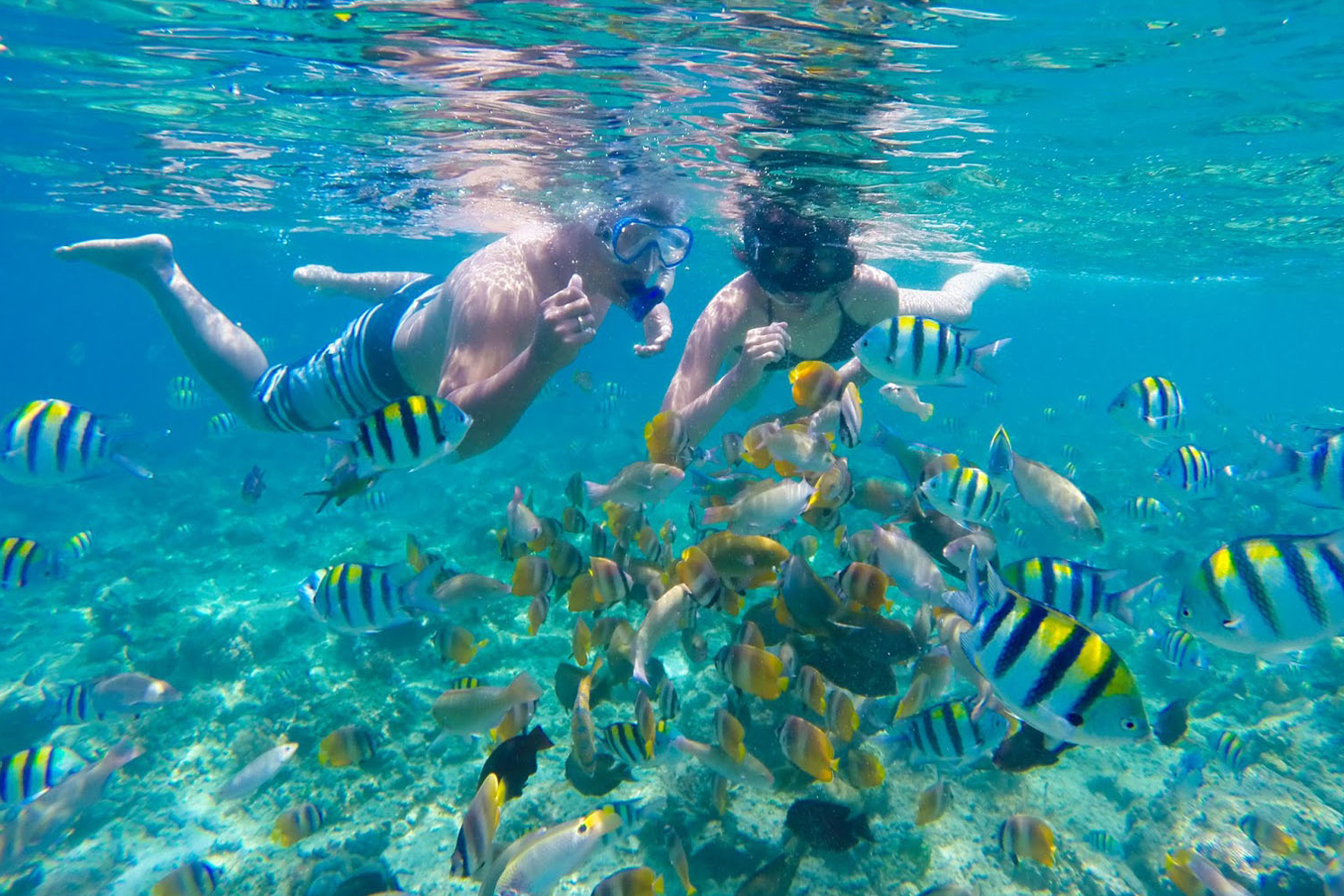
Clear water for snorkelers near Nanggu Island, Lombok, Indonesia.

In tropical coastal waters, the water is clear thanks to low nutrient inputs, low primary production, and coral reefs acting as a natural buffer that keep sediments from getting resuspended. The clearest recorded water on Earth is either Blue Lake, New Zealand or the Weddell Sea near Antarctica, both of which claim Secchi depths of 80 meters (230 to 260 feet).

=== Low water clarity ===
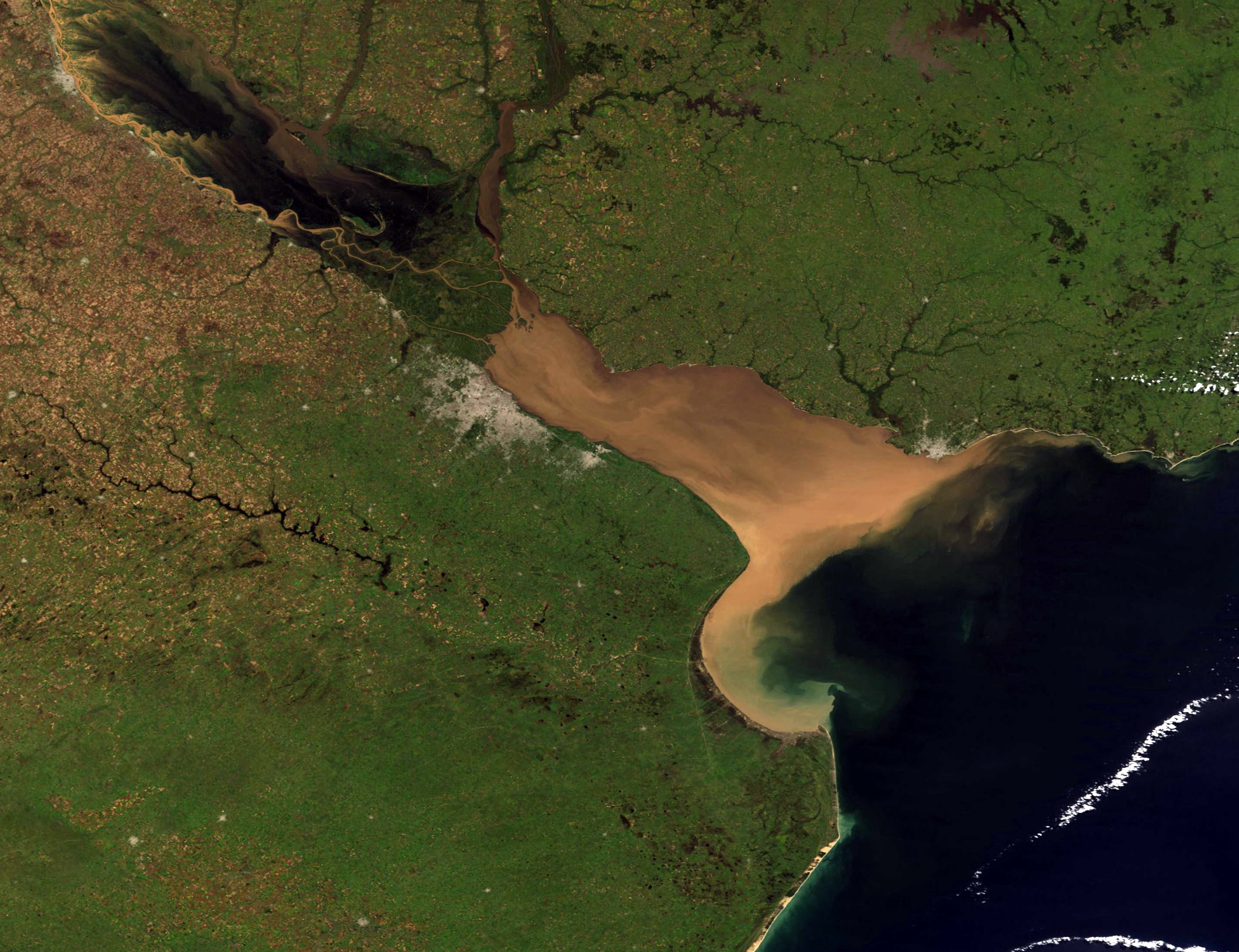
Turbid water in the Río de la Plata estuary between Uruguay and Argentina.

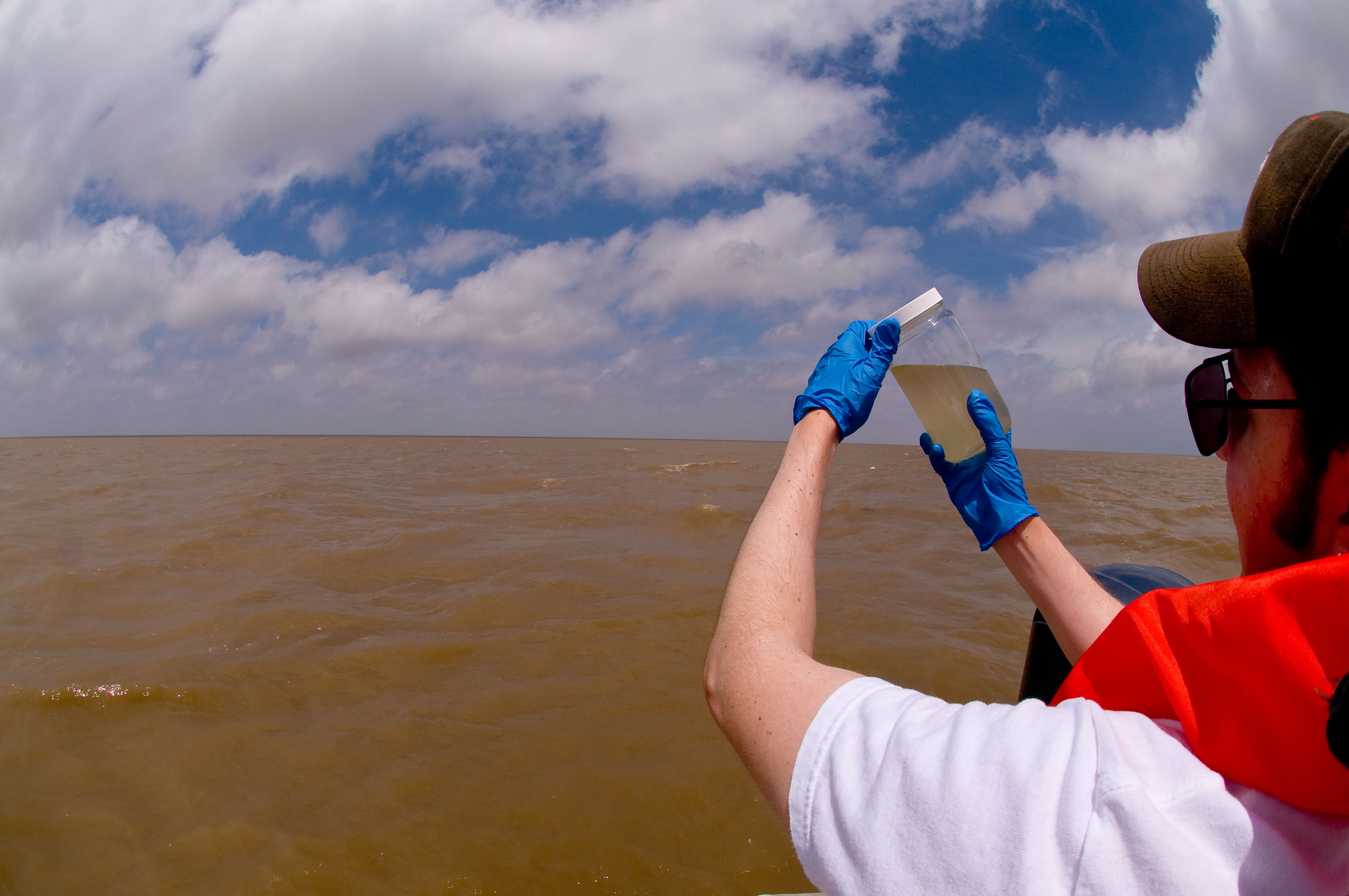
Turbid water in the Gulf of Mexico near the coast of Louisiana, United States.

Very low water clarity can be found where high loads of suspended sediments are transported from land. Some examples are estuaries where rivers with high loads of sediments empty into the ocean. One example is the Río de la Plata, an estuary in South America between Uruguay and Argentina where the Uruguay River and the Parana River empty into the Atlantic ocean. The Río de la Plata shows long-term mean TSS concentrations between 20 and 100 grams per cubic meter, higher than most estuaries. Another example is the gulf coast of North America where the Mississippi River meets the Gulf of Mexico. Turbid water from snowmelt and rain washes high loads of sediment downstream each spring, creating a sediment plume and making the water clarity very low. Water bodies can also experience low water clarity after extreme events like volcanic eruptions. After the eruption of Mount St. Helens, the water of Spirit Lake, Washington was darkened by decaying trees in the lake and had a Secchi depth of only 1 to 2 centimeters.

== Water clarity vs. water quality ==
Water clarity is more specific than water quality. The term "water clarity" more strictly describes the amount of light that passes through water or an object's visibility in water. The term "water quality" more broadly refers to many characteristics of water, including temperature, dissolved oxygen, the amount of nutrients, or the presence of algal blooms. How clear the water appears is only one component of water quality.

An underwater ecosystem can have high water clarity yet low water quality, and vice versa. Scientists have observed that many lakes are becoming less clear while also recovering from acid rain. This phenomenon has been seen in the northeastern United States and northern Europe. In the past, some lakes were ecologically bare, yet clear, while acidity was high. In recent years, as acidity is reduced and watersheds become more forested, many lakes are less clear but also ecologically healthier with higher concentrations of dissolved organic carbon and more natural water chemistry.

== See also ==
- Beer-Lambert law
- Color of water
- Forel-Ule scale
- Ocean color
- Ocean optics
- Secchi disk
- Turbidity
- Visibility
- Water quality
