= Ule =

Ule is a German surname. It may refer to:

- Ernst Heinrich Georg Ule (1854–1915), German botanist and explorer
- Otto Eduard Vincenz Ule (1820–1876), German natural science writer
- Wilhelm Ule (1861–1940), German geographer and limnologist
