= Cipuropsis subandina =

Scientific classification
- Kingdom: Plantae
- Clade: Tracheophytes
- Clade: Angiosperms
- Clade: Monocots
- Clade: Commelinids
- Order: Poales
- Family: Bromeliaceae
- Subfamily: Tillandsioideae
- Genus: Cipuropsis
- Species: C. subandina

Binomial name
- Cipuropsis subandina Ule

Synonyms
- Tillandsia subandina (Ule) Mez ex L.B.Sm.; Vriesea subandina (Ule) L.B.Sm. & Pittendr.

Species of flowering plant

Cipuropsis subandina is a species of flowering plant in the family Bromeliaceae, native to northeastern Peru. It was first described by Ernst Heinrich Georg Ule in 1907.
