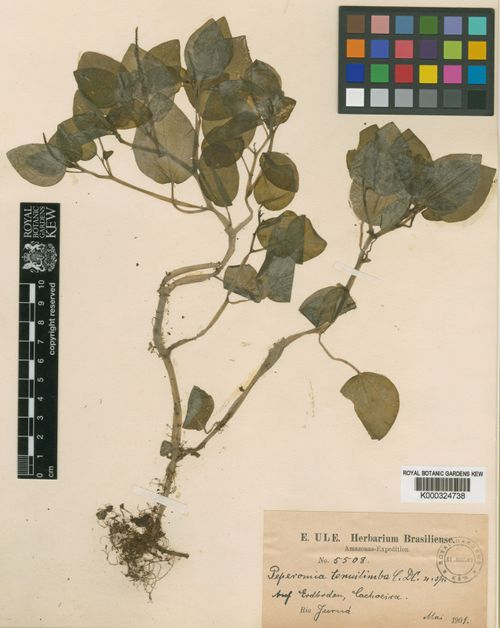

Scientific classification
- Kingdom: Plantae
- Clade: Tracheophytes
- Clade: Angiosperms
- Clade: Magnoliids
- Order: Piperales
- Family: Piperaceae
- Genus: Peperomia
- Species: P. tenuilimba

Binomial name
- Peperomia tenuilimba C.DC.

Synonyms
- Peperomia discistila C.DC.; Peperomia enantiostachya C.DC.; Peperomia flagrans Trel.; Peperomia imbracteata Yunck.

= Peperomia tenuilimba =

Species of flowering plant

Peperomia tenuilimba is a species of flowering plant in the genus Peperomia. It primarily grows on wet tropical biomes. Its conservation status is Threatened but with low confidence.

== Description ==
The first specimens where collected at 1500 metres elevation on Antioquia.

Change of leaves glabrous on both sides, juniors above and below the principal veins of a leaf, sparsely pubescent, dry, skin-like, sub-pellucid, 7-nerved, catkins opposite, isolated, leaves equal to densiflora, petiolate, subelliptic-lanceolate, apex acute, base subducting into the petiole, rachis foveolate, subglobose fruit, ovary submerged, oval, top flattened, stigmatiferous.

== Taxonomy and naming ==
It was described in 1905 by Casimir de Candolle in "Verhandlungen des Botanischen Vereins für die Provinz Brandenburg.", from collected specimens by Ernst Heinrich Georg Ule in 1901. It gets its name from Tenui + limba, which means "Tiny limb".

== Distribution and habitat ==
It is endemic to South America, but primarily grows in Colombia. Its native distribution in Colombia is 1500-3000 metres in the Andes. It grows on epiphyte environment and is a herb.
