= Josemania =

Scientific classification
- Kingdom: Plantae
- Clade: Tracheophytes
- Clade: Angiosperms
- Clade: Monocots
- Clade: Commelinids
- Order: Poales
- Family: Bromeliaceae
- Subfamily: Tillandsioideae
- Genus: Josemania; W.Till & Barfuss

Species
- See text.

Synonyms
- See text.

Genus of plants

Josemania is a genus of flowering plant in the family Bromeliaceae, first described in 2016.

== Taxonomy ==
As of October 2022, the genus is accepted by the Encyclopedia of Bromeliads, while Plants of the World Online sinks it into Cipuropsis. Five species are accepted by the Encyclopedia of Bromeliads:

- Josemania asplundii (L.B.Sm.) W.Till & Barfuss, syn. Cipuropsis asplundii (L.B.Sm.) Christenh. & Byng
- Josemania delicatula (L.B.Sm.) W.Till & Barfuss, syn. Cipuropsis delicatula (L.B.Sm.) Christenh. & Byng
- Josemania pinnata (Mez & Sodiro) W.Till & Barfuss, syn. Cipuropsis pinnata (Mez & Sodiro) Christenh. & Byng
- Josemania singularis (Mez & Wercklé) W.Till & Barfuss, syn. Cipuropsis singularis (Mez & Wercklé) Christenh. & Byng
- Josemania truncata (L.B.Sm.) W.Till & Barfuss, syn. Cipuropsis truncata (L.B.Sm.) Christenh. & Byng
