= Cipuropsis asmussii =

Scientific classification
- Kingdom: Plantae
- Clade: Tracheophytes
- Clade: Angiosperms
- Clade: Monocots
- Clade: Commelinids
- Order: Poales
- Family: Bromeliaceae
- Subfamily: Tillandsioideae
- Genus: Cipuropsis
- Species: C. asmussii

Binomial name
- Cipuropsis asmussii Gouda

Species of flowering plant

Cipuropsis asmussii is a species of flowering plant in the family Bromeliaceae, native to Venezuela. It was first described by Eric J. Gouda in 2017.
