= François-Alphonse Forel =

Swiss scientist (1841–1912)

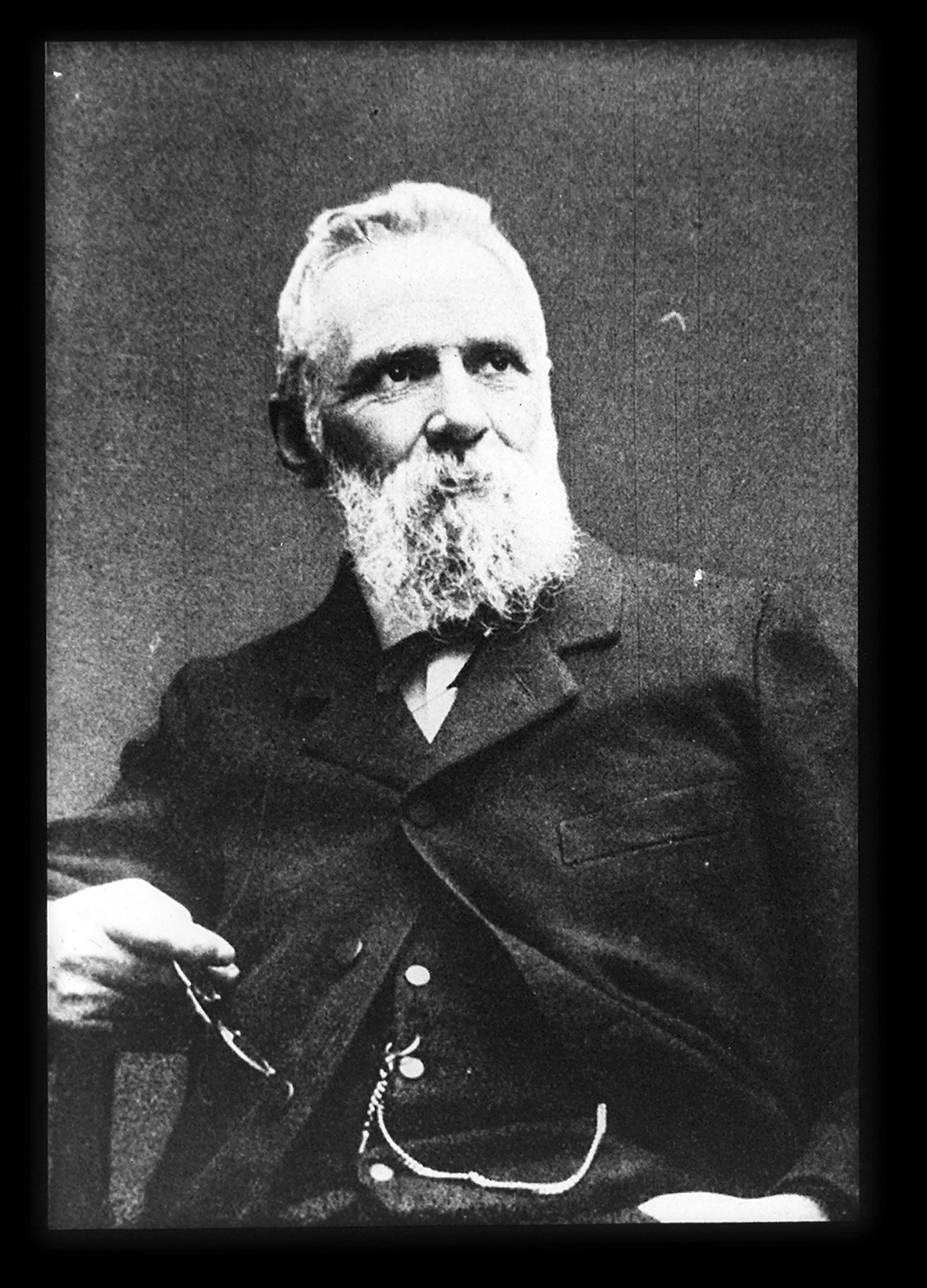
- Born: February 2, 1841; Morges, Switzerland
- Died: August 7, 1912 (aged 71); Morges, Switzerland
- Education: Academy of Geneva; University of Würzburg
- Known for: Forel–Ule scale Limnology
- Scientific career
- Fields: Natural science
- Workplaces: University of Lausanne

François-Alphonse Forel (French pronunciation: [fʁɑ̃swa alfɔ̃s fɔʁɛl]; 2 February 1841 – 7 August 1912) was a Swiss physician and scientist who pioneered the study of lakes, and is thus considered the founder. He was also professor at the University of Lausanne and the Father of limnology. Limnology is the study of bodies of fresh water and their biological, chemical, and physical features.

== Childhood and family ==
Forel was born in Morges, Switzerland on Lake Geneva. His father, François Marie Étienne Forel (1765-1865) was a well-respected historian and a jurist and was a strong influence in Forel's life. From a young age, François-Alphonse Forel became involved in some of archaeological studies of his father's colleagues. Several of Forel's family members were also respected scholars and scientists.

== Education ==
Forel began his education at the Collège de Morges. Eventually, he left Morges for secondary school in Geneva at the Gymnase de Genève. There, he studied the natural sciences and medicine. Then he attended university at Académie de Genève where he obtained a Bachelor of Letters and a Bachelor of Physical and Natural Sciences. When he turned 18, he left his home country to attend the Académie de Montpellier in Montpellier, France. He studied at the university for two years and spent a portion of time after that, studying medicine on his own in Paris, France. Later, he moved to Germany and studied at the University of Würzburg. In the year 1865 when Forel was 24 year old, he obtained a doctorate degree in medicine and obstetrics.

== Work and professional life ==
Shortly after obtaining his doctoral decree, Forel returned to Lake Geneva in Switzerland. There, he began his own study of the lake which encompassed zootomy, physics, chemistry, biology, natural history, and even economics. In 1869, he became a science professor at the University of Lausanne (then known as the Academy of Lausanne) which was located near his home at Lake Geneva. He taught histology, anatomy, and physiology.

But his real love was the lake; his investigations of biology, chemistry, water circulation, and sedimentation, and most importantly their interactions, established the foundation of a new discipline. He named his activity limnology in analogy with oceanography ("limnography" could have been confused with the limnograph, which measures water level in lakes).

In his chief work, Le Léman was published in three volumes between 1892 and 1904. The volumes covered a range of topics including the definition of limnology, as well as the geographic settings, geology, climatology, hydrology and bathymetry of lake systems. The Monograph then went on to describe lacustrine hydraulics, seiches, waves and currents, temperature stratification, optics, acoustics and chemistry. This was cemented by his publication of a handbook on the topic. He discovered the phenomenon of density currents in lakes, and explained seiches, the rhythmic oscillations observed in enclosed waters.

He is also known for his work on the optical phenomenon the Fata Morgana which can be seen when looking out across Lake Geneva among other places.

In collaboration with Wilhelm Ule, developed the Forel-Ule scale, used to evaluate the color of a body of water. In a totally different field, in cooperation with the Italian seismologist Michele Stefano de Rossi, he developed the Rossi–Forel scale to describe the intensity of an earthquake.

== End of life and legacy ==
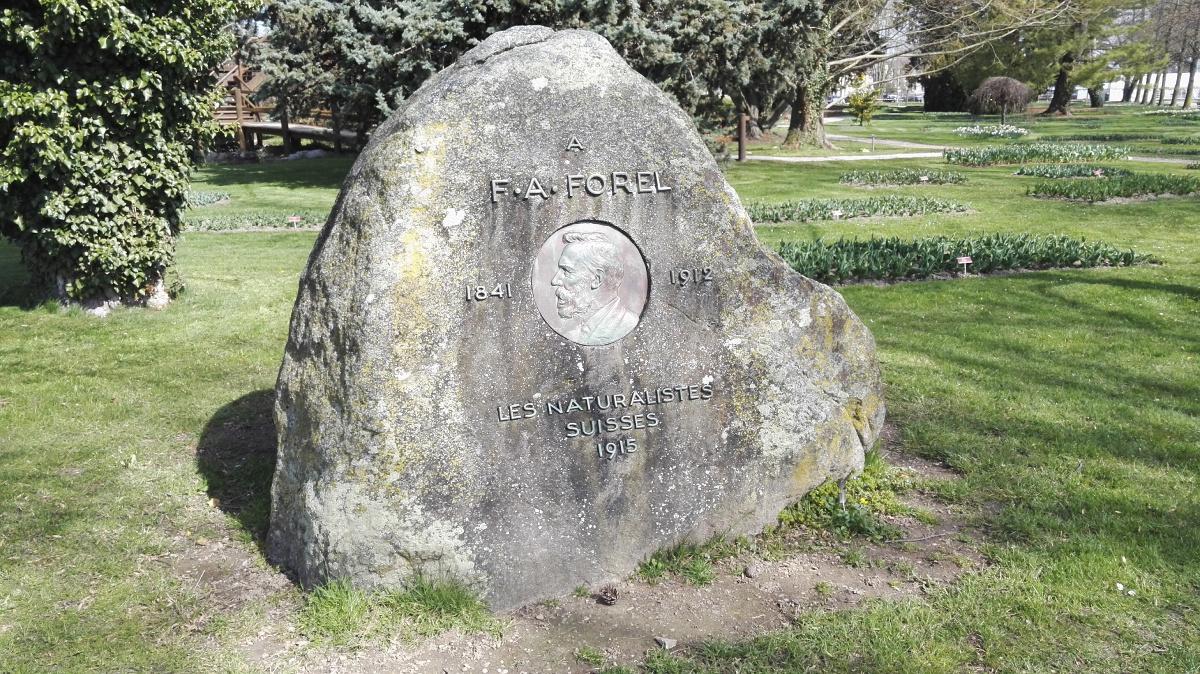
A monument by sculptor Raphaël Lugeon commemorating François-Alphonse Forel's life and legacy.

By the time of his death in 1912, he had amassed a total of 288 academic publications.

So wide was his knowledge that he was referred to as "the Faraday of Lakes" in his obituary in Nature Magazine. He was well regarded by the Scottish scientific community, visiting at least once, and also being elected as an honorary fellow of the Royal Society of Edinburgh.

The Institute F.-A. Forel of the University of Geneva is named after Forel.

Foreltinden, a mountain at Spitsbergen, Svalbard, is named after him.

Forel (station) in Maule, Chile is named after him after he lived close to the station.

The submersible F.-A. Forel (PX-28) is named after him and has been used to make scientific measurements in Lake Geneva.
