= Josemania truncata =

Scientific classification
- Kingdom: Plantae
- Clade: Tracheophytes
- Clade: Angiosperms
- Clade: Monocots
- Clade: Commelinids
- Order: Poales
- Family: Bromeliaceae
- Subfamily: Tillandsioideae
- Genus: Josemania
- Species: J. truncata

Binomial name
- Josemania truncata (L.B.Sm.) W.Till & Barfuss

Synonyms
- Cipuropsis truncata (L.B.Sm.) Christenh. & Byng; Tillandsia truncata L.B.Sm.

Species of plant

Josemania truncata is a species of flowering plant in the family Bromeliaceae, native to Colombia and Ecuador. It was first described by Lyman Bradford Smith in 1954 as Tillandsia truncata. Plants of the World Online sinks the genus Josemania into Cipuropsis, treating this species as Cipuropsis truncata.
