= Emil Adolf Rossmässler =

German biologist (1806-1867)

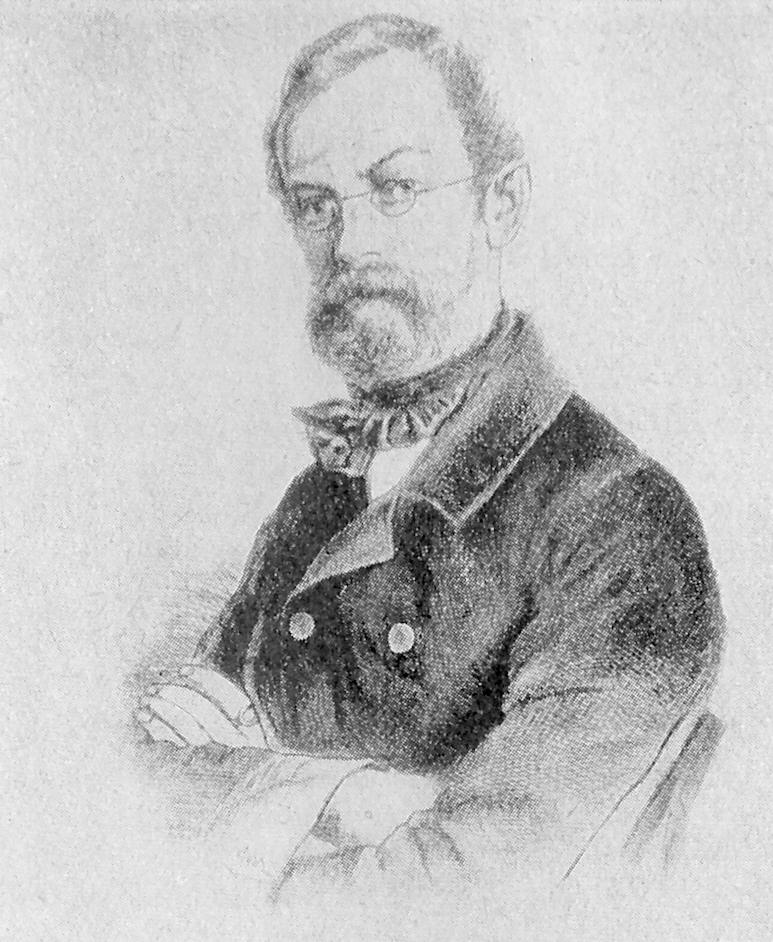
Emil Adolf Rossmässler

Emil Adolf Rossmässler (Emil Adolf Roßmäßler, Emil Adolph Roßmäßler) (March 3, 1806 in Leipzig – April 8, 1867 in Leipzig) was a German biologist. With Otto Eduard Vincenz Ule and Karl Johann August Müller, he was co-founder of the journal Die Natur in 1852 and 1859 the sole editor of the journal Aus der Heimath. Rossmässler was a pioneer and the leading advocate of popularizing science in nineteenth-century Germany. He also belonged to the early writers on the building and maintenance of freshwater aquariums. Rossmässler edited the exsiccata Plantae Lipsienses, Weidanae et Tharandtinae (c. 1831).

== Publications ==
Rossmässler's publications included:

- 1832: Systematische Übersicht des Tierreiches
- 1835–1839: Iconographie der Land- und Süßwassermollusken (3 volumes) - (Iconography of land Mollusca and freshwater Mollusca)
  - 1835–1837: Iconographie der Land- und Süßwasser-Mollusken, mit vorzüglicher Berücksichtigung der europäischen noch nicht abgebildeten Arten. Volume 1. - pp. Heft 1: [1], I-VI [= 1-6], 1–132, [1-2], Heft 2: [1-2], 1-26, Heft 3: [1-3], 1-3
  - 1838–1844: Iconographie der Land- und Süßwassermollusken, mit vorzüglicher Berücksichtigung der europäischen noch nicht abgebildeten Arten. Volume 2. - pp. (4+44 pp.), (4+46 pp.), (4+15 pp.), (4+37 pp.), Taf. 31–60. Dresden, Leipzig. (Arnold).
  - 1854–1859 - Iconographie der Land- und Süsswassermollusken Europa's, mit vorzüglicher Berücksichtigung kritischer und noch nicht abgebildeter Arten. Volume 3. - pp. I-VIII, 1-39, I-VIII, 1-77, [1], I-VIII, 1–140, Taf. 61–90. Leipzig.
- 1847: "Helix ligata Müll. Eine kritische Bemerkung". Zeitschrift für Malakozoologie 4: 161–164. Cassel.
- 1850–53: Der Mensch im Spiegel der Natur
- 1853: "Kurzer Bericht über meine malakozoologische Reise durch einen Theil des südöstlichen Spanien". Zeitschrift für Malakozoologie 10 (11): 161–171. Cassel.
- 1856: Die Geschichte der Erde
- 1857: "Diagnoses novorum Heliceorum". Malakozoologische Blätter 4: 38–41. Cassel.
- 1858: with Bernhard A. Auerswald, Botanische Unterhaltungen zum Verständniß der heimathlichen Flora . Leipzig, Hermann Mendelssohn.
- 1865: Volksbildung
- 1908: Flora im Winterkleide .
