= Cipuropsis amicorum =

Scientific classification
- Kingdom: Plantae
- Clade: Tracheophytes
- Clade: Angiosperms
- Clade: Monocots
- Clade: Commelinids
- Order: Poales
- Family: Bromeliaceae
- Subfamily: Tillandsioideae
- Genus: Cipuropsis
- Species: C. amicorum

Binomial name
- Cipuropsis amicorum (I.Ramírez & Bevil.) Gouda

Synonyms
- Tillandsia amicorum I.Ramírez & Bevil.

Species of plant

Cipuropsis amicorum is a species of flowering plant in the family Bromeliaceae, native to Venezuela. It was first described in 1990 as Tillandsia amicorum.
