= Mezobromelia pleiosticha =

Scientific classification
- Kingdom: Plantae
- Clade: Tracheophytes
- Clade: Angiosperms
- Clade: Monocots
- Clade: Commelinids
- Order: Poales
- Family: Bromeliaceae
- Genus: Mezobromelia
- Species: M. pleiosticha

Binomial name
- Mezobromelia pleiosticha (Grisebach) Utley & H.Luther

Synonyms
- Guzmania pleiosticha (Griseb.) Mez; Guzmania splitgerberi Mez; Mezobromelia pleiosticha (Griseb.) Utley & H.Luther; Thecophyllum splitgerberi (Mez) Pittendr.; Tillandsia pleiosticha Griseb.; Tillandsia pleiostachya Baker; Vriesea pleiosticha (Grisebach) Gouda; Vriesea splitgerberi (Mez) L.B.Sm. & Pittendr.

Species of flowering plant

Mezobromelia pleiosticha is a species of flowering plant in the family Bromeliaceae. This species is native to northwestern South America.
