= Josemania pinnata =

Scientific classification
- Kingdom: Plantae
- Clade: Tracheophytes
- Clade: Angiosperms
- Clade: Monocots
- Clade: Commelinids
- Order: Poales
- Family: Bromeliaceae
- Subfamily: Tillandsioideae
- Genus: Josemania
- Species: J. pinnata

Binomial name
- Josemania pinnata (Mez & Sodiro) W.Till & Barfuss

Synonyms
- Cipuropsis pinnata (Mez & Sodiro) Christenh. & Byng; Tillandsia pinnata Mez & Sodiro

Species of plant

Josemania pinnata, synonym Cipuropsis pinnata, is a species in the family Bromeliaceae, native to Panama, Colombia and Ecuador.
