= Gregbrownia lyman-smithii =

Scientific classification
- Kingdom: Plantae
- Clade: Tracheophytes
- Clade: Angiosperms
- Clade: Monocots
- Clade: Commelinids
- Order: Poales
- Family: Bromeliaceae
- Subfamily: Tillandsioideae
- Genus: Gregbrownia
- Species: G. lyman-smithii

Binomial name
- Gregbrownia lyman-smithii (Rauh & Barthlott) W.Till & Barfuss

Synonyms
- Mezobromelia lyman-smithii Rauh & Barthlott

Species of flowering plant

Gregbrownia lyman-smithii is a species of flowering plant in the family Bromeliaceae, native to Ecuador. It was first described in 1976 as Mezobromelia lyman-smithii.
