= Mezobromelia hospitalis =

Scientific classification
- Kingdom: Plantae
- Clade: Tracheophytes
- Clade: Angiosperms
- Clade: Monocots
- Clade: Commelinids
- Order: Poales
- Family: Bromeliaceae
- Subfamily: Tillandsioideae
- Genus: Mezobromelia
- Species: M. hospitalis

Binomial name
- Mezobromelia hospitalis (L.B.Sm.) J.R.Grant

Synonyms
- Cipuropsis hospitalis (L.B.Sm.) Christenh. & Byng; Tillandsia hospitalis L.B.Sm.; Vriesea hospitalis (L.B.Sm.) L.B.Sm.

Species of plant

Mezobromelia hospitalis, synonym Cipuropsis hospitalis, is a species of flowering plant in the family Bromeliaceae, native to Colombia. It was first described by Lyman Bradford Smith in 1948 as Tillandsia hospitalis.
