= Josemania asplundii =

Scientific classification
- Kingdom: Plantae
- Clade: Tracheophytes
- Clade: Angiosperms
- Clade: Monocots
- Clade: Commelinids
- Order: Poales
- Family: Bromeliaceae
- Subfamily: Tillandsioideae
- Genus: Josemania
- Species: J. asplundii

Binomial name
- Josemania asplundii (L.B.Sm.) W.Till & Barfuss

Synonyms
- Tillandsia asplundii L.B.Sm.; Cipuropsis asplundii (L.B.Sm.) Christenh. & Byng

Species of plant

Josemania asplundii, synonym Tillandsia asplundii, is a species in the genus Josemania, native to Ecuador and Peru. It was first acquired by the 1842 United States Expedition in South America.
