= Josemania delicatula =

Scientific classification
- Kingdom: Plantae
- Clade: Tracheophytes
- Clade: Angiosperms
- Clade: Monocots
- Clade: Commelinids
- Order: Poales
- Family: Bromeliaceae
- Subfamily: Tillandsioideae
- Genus: Josemania
- Species: J. delicatula

Binomial name
- Josemania delicatula (L.B.Sm.) W.Till & Barfuss

Synonyms
- Tillandsia delicatula L.B.Sm.; Cipuropsis delicatula (L.B.Sm.) Christenh. & Byng

Species of plant

Josemania delicatula, synonym Cipuropsis delicatula, is a species in the family Bromeliaceae, native to Colombia.
