= Gregbrownia brownii =

Conservation status
- Vulnerable (IUCN 3.1)

Scientific classification
- Kingdom: Plantae
- Clade: Tracheophytes
- Clade: Angiosperms
- Clade: Monocots
- Clade: Commelinids
- Order: Poales
- Family: Bromeliaceae
- Subfamily: Tillandsioideae
- Genus: Gregbrownia
- Species: G. brownii

Binomial name
- Gregbrownia brownii (H.Luther) W.Till & Barfuss

Synonyms
- Mezobromelia brownii H.Luther

Species of flowering plant

Gregbrownia brownii, synonym Mezobromelia brownii, is a species of flowering plant in the family Bromeliaceae. It is endemic to Ecuador. Its natural habitats are subtropical or tropical moist montane forests and subtropical or tropical high-altitude shrubland. It is threatened by habitat loss.
