= Josemania singularis =

Scientific classification
- Kingdom: Plantae
- Clade: Tracheophytes
- Clade: Angiosperms
- Clade: Monocots
- Clade: Commelinids
- Order: Poales
- Family: Bromeliaceae
- Subfamily: Tillandsioideae
- Genus: Josemania
- Species: J. singularis

Binomial name
- Josemania singularis (Mez & Wercklé) W.Till & Barfuss

Synonyms
- Tillandsia singularis Mez & Wercklé; Cipuropsis singularis (Mez & Wercklé) Christenh. & Byng

Species of plant

Josemania singularis, synonym Cipuropsis singularis, is a species of flowering plant in the family Bromeliaceae. This species is native to Costa Rica and Panama.
