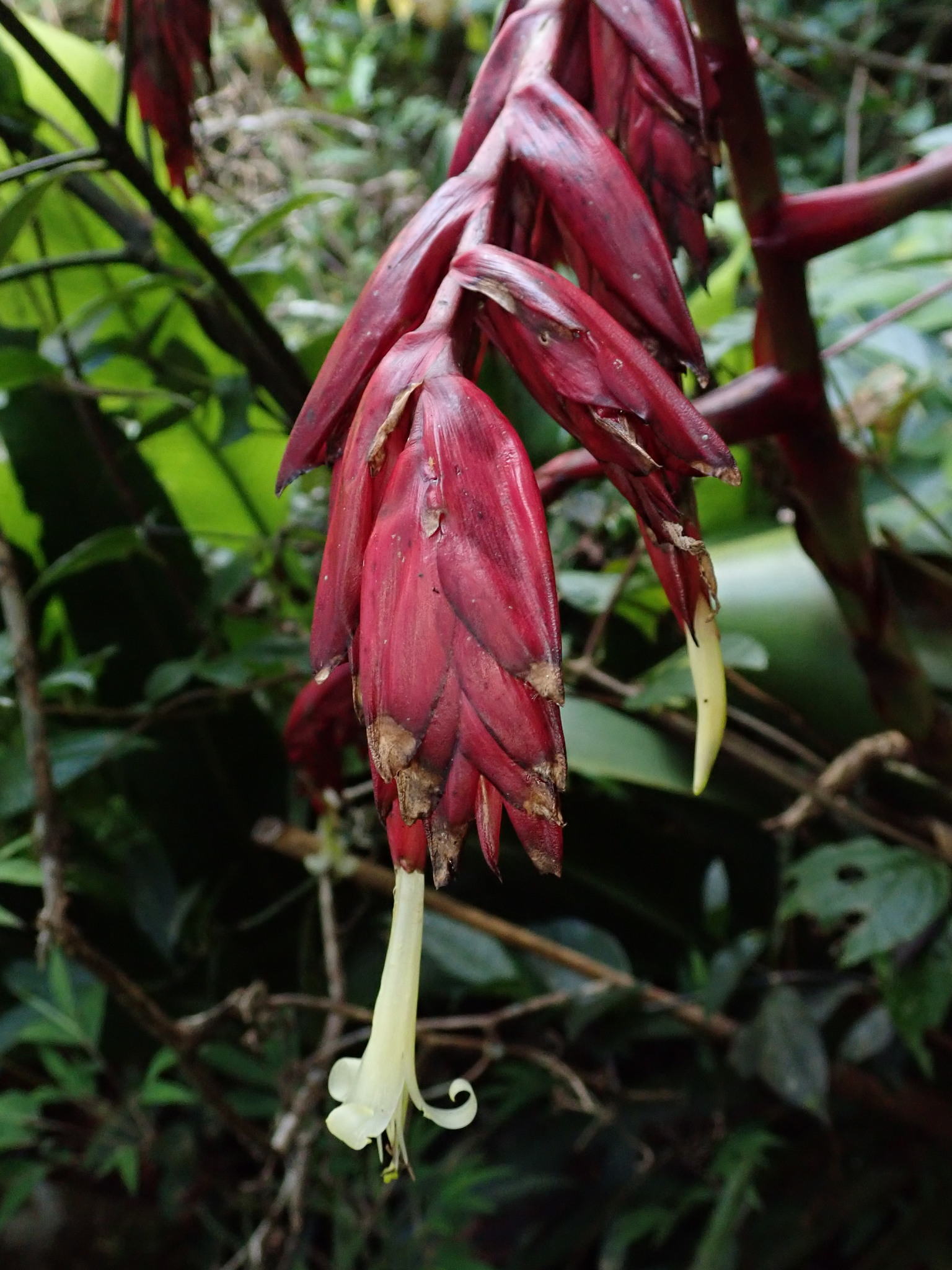

Conservation status
- Endangered (IUCN 3.1)

Scientific classification
- Kingdom: Plantae
- Clade: Tracheophytes
- Clade: Angiosperms
- Clade: Monocots
- Clade: Commelinids
- Order: Poales
- Family: Bromeliaceae
- Subfamily: Tillandsioideae
- Genus: Gregbrownia
- Species: G. fulgens

Binomial name
- Gregbrownia fulgens (L.B.Sm.) W.Till & Barfuss

Synonyms
- Mezobromelia fulgens L.B.Sm.

= Gregbrownia fulgens =

Species of flowering plant

Gregbrownia fulgens, synonym Mezobromelia fulgens, is a species of flowering plant in the family Bromeliaceae. It is endemic to Ecuador. It grows in the páramo and high-elevation forests of the Andes. It is terrestrial or grows as an epiphyte.

There are five known subpopulations of this bromeliad. It is threatened by loss of habitat to agriculture.
