= Otto Eduard Vincenz Ule =

German writer

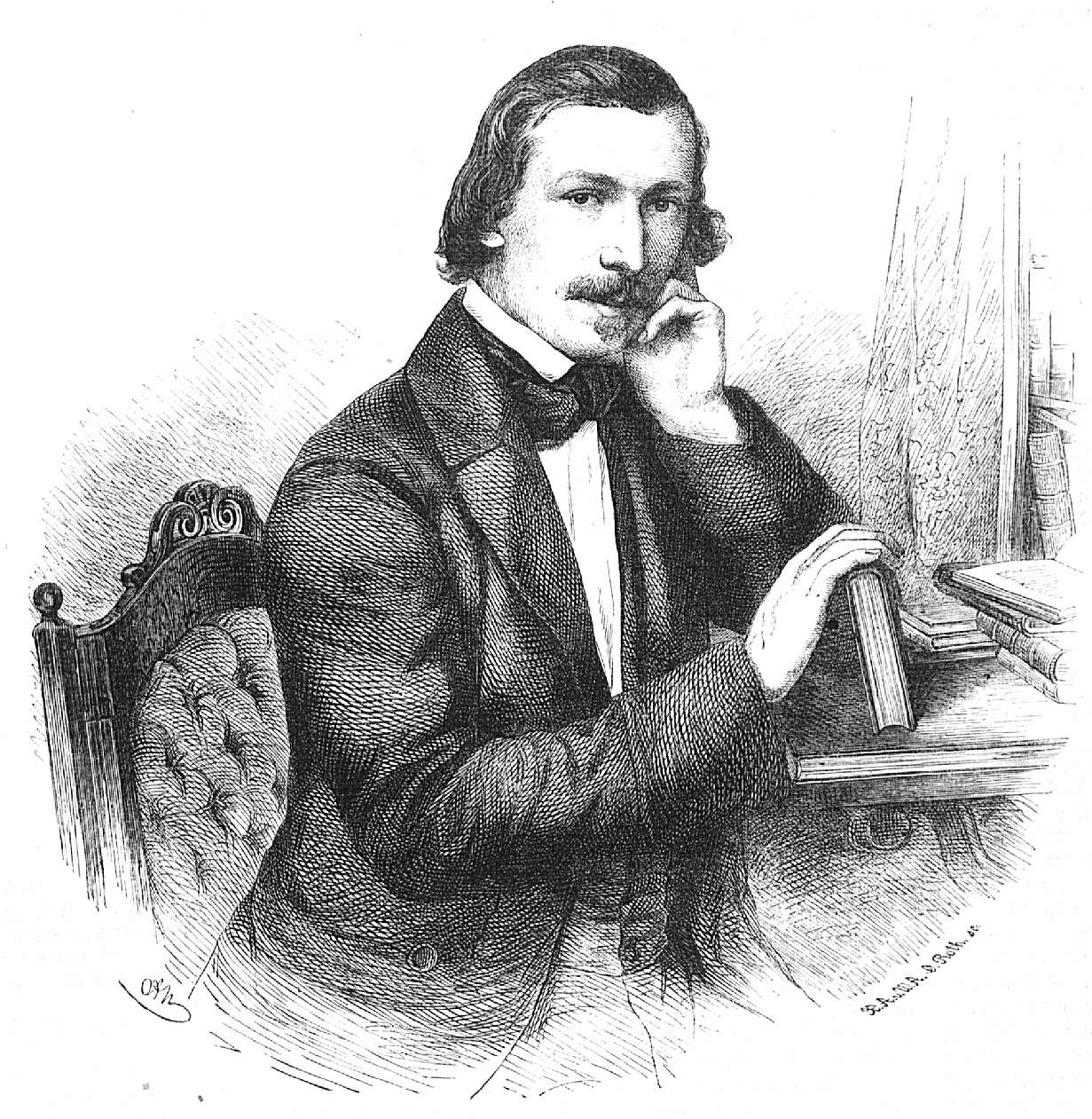
Otto Eduard Vincenz Ule; illustration from an issue of "Die Gartenlaube" (1858)

Otto Eduard Vincenz Ule (22 January 1820, in Lossow – 7 August 1876, in Halle an der Saale) was a German writer, known for his popularization of natural sciences, and liberal politician. He was the father of botanist Ernst Heinrich Georg Ule (1854–1915) and geographer Wilhelm Ule (1861–1940).

From 1840 he studied at the University of Halle, first theology, and later mathematics and natural sciences, of which, he was a pupil of Hermann Burmeister. He then continued his education at the University of Berlin as a student of Heinrich Wilhelm Dove, and in 1845 received his master's degree from Halle. He then taught classes in natural sciences in Frankfurt an der Oder (from 1846) and at the agricultural college in Quetz, near Halle (1848–51). Afterwards, he devoted himself to private research and worked as a freelance writer. With Karl Johann August Müller and Emil Adolf Rossmässler, he was co-founder of the journal Die Natur in 1852, which became the flagship journal of popular science in Germany.

He was politically active throughout his career — in the 1860s he founded an independent progress party for Halle and the Saalekreis. While serving as commandant of a volunteer fire-brigade, he was seriously injured by falling debris and died the following day.

== Selected works ==
- Untersuchung über den Raum und die Raumtheorien des Aristoteles und Kant, 1850 – Study of space and the space theories of Aristotle and Kant.
- Das Weltall. Beschreibung und Geschichte des Kosmos im Entwicklungskampfe der Natur (2 volumes, 1850) – The universe; description and history of the cosmos in the developing struggle of nature.
- Die Natur. Ihre Kräfte, Gesetze und Erscheinungen im Geiste kosmischer Anschauung, 1851 – Nature, its forces, laws and phenomena in the spirit of cosmic intuition.
- Die Wunder der Sternenwelt, 1860; The wonders of the starry world.
- Die neuesten Entdeckungen in Afrika, Australien, und der arktischen Polarwelt mit besonderer Rucksicht auf die Natur- und Kulturverhältnisse der entdeckten Länder, 1861; The latest discoveries in Africa, Australia and the Arctic polar world.
- Dr. Otto Ule’s ausgewählte kleine naturwissenschaftliche Schriften (4 volumes, 1864–67) – Ule's selected smaller scientific writings.
- Alexander von Humboldt, 1869. On Alexander von Humboldt.
- Die Erde und die Erscheinungen ihrer Oberfläche, eine physische Erdbeschreibung (with Élisée Reclus, 1871; 2nd edition by Wilhelm Ule, 1892); The earth and the phenomena of its surface.
