= Ernst Heinrich Georg Ule =

German botanist and plant collector

Ernst Heinrich Georg Ule (12 March 1854 – 15 July 1915) was a German botanist and plant collector.

== Biography ==
He was born on 12 March 1854 in Halle an der Saale to science writer Otto Eduard Vincenz Ule (1820–1876). His brother was geographer Wilhelm Ule (1861–1940).

Originally trained as a gardener, and worked at the botanical gardens in Halle and Berlin. He then emigrated to Brazil in 1883, where he worked as a private tutor and botanical collector. Subsequently, he served as a naturalista viajante (traveling naturalist) at the National Museum in Rio de Janeiro, where he was appointed sub-director (1895), and later director, of the museum's botanical department. His series Herbarium Brasiliense with a lot of numbered specimens is now widely distributed in major herbaria worldwide.

From 1900 to 1903 he was engaged in botanical research in the Amazonas region of Brazil, during which time, he also conducted botanical investigations in neighbouring areas. In 1905, he issued three exsiccatae distributing bryophyte and fungi specimens from Brazil.

After his return to Germany, he worked as a scientific assistant at the Berlin-Dahlem Botanical Garden and Museum (1913–14).

He died on 15 July 1915.

== Legacy ==
Ule has several botanical genera named in his honor, such as:

- Uleanthus, named by Hermann Harms in 1905, family Fabaceae
- Ulearum, named by Adolf Engler in 1905, family Araceae
- Uleiella, named by J.Schröt. in 1894, fungi in family Uleiellaceae
- Uleiorchis, named by Frederico Carlos Hoehne in 1944, family Orchidaceae
- Uleobryum, named by Broth. in 1906, moss in family Pottiaceae
- Uleodendron, named by Stephan Rauschert in 1982, family Moraceae
- Uleodothis, named by Theiss. & Syd. in 1915, fungi in family Venturiaceae
- Uleophytum, named by Georg Hieronymus in 1907, family Asteraceae
- Uleomyces, named by Henn. in 1895, fungi in family Cookellaceae
- Uleomycina, named by Petr. in 1954, fungi in family Elsinoaceae
- Uleothyrium, named by Petr. in 1929, fungi in family Asterinaceae

== Selected writings ==
- Kautschukgewinnung und Kautschukhandel am Amazonenstrome, 1906 – Rubber production and trade in the Amazon.
- Das Innere von Nordost-Brasilien, 1908 – The interior of northeast Brazil.
- Kautshukgewinnung und Kautschukhandel in Bahia, 1908 – Rubber production and trade in Bahia.
- Biologische Beobachtungen im Amazonasgebiet, 1915 – Biological observations in the Amazon.
