= Gregbrownia hutchisonii =

Scientific classification
- Kingdom: Plantae
- Clade: Tracheophytes
- Clade: Angiosperms
- Clade: Monocots
- Clade: Commelinids
- Order: Poales
- Family: Bromeliaceae
- Subfamily: Tillandsioideae
- Genus: Gregbrownia
- Species: G. hutchisonii

Binomial name
- Gregbrownia hutchisonii (L.B.Sm.) W.Till & Barfuss

Synonyms
- Mezobromelia hutchisonii (L.B.Sm.) W.Weber & L.B.Sm.; Mezobromelia trollii Rauh; Tillandsia hutchisonii L.B.Sm.

Species of plant

Gregbrownia hutchisonii is a species of flowering plant in the family Bromeliaceae, native to northern Peru. It was first described by Lyman Bradford Smith in 1966 as Tillandsia hutchisonii.
