= Uleophytum =

Scientific classification
- Kingdom: Plantae
- Clade: Tracheophytes
- Clade: Angiosperms
- Clade: Eudicots
- Clade: Asterids
- Order: Asterales
- Family: Asteraceae
- Subfamily: Asteroideae
- Tribe: Eupatorieae
- Genus: Uleophytum; Hieron.
- Species: U. scandens

Binomial name
- Uleophytum scandens Hieron.

Genus of flowering plants

Uleophytum is a genus of flowering plants in the family Asteraceae. It contains a single species, Uleophytum scandens.
