= Mezobromelia bicolor =

Scientific classification
- Kingdom: Plantae
- Clade: Tracheophytes
- Clade: Angiosperms
- Clade: Monocots
- Clade: Commelinids
- Order: Poales
- Family: Bromeliaceae
- Subfamily: Tillandsioideae
- Genus: Mezobromelia
- Species: M. bicolor

Binomial name
- Mezobromelia bicolor L.B.Sm.

Synonyms
- Cipuropsis bicolor (L.B.Sm.) Christenh. & Byng

Species of flowering plant

Mezobromelia bicolor is a plant species in the family Bromeliaceae. This species is native to Ecuador and Colombia.
