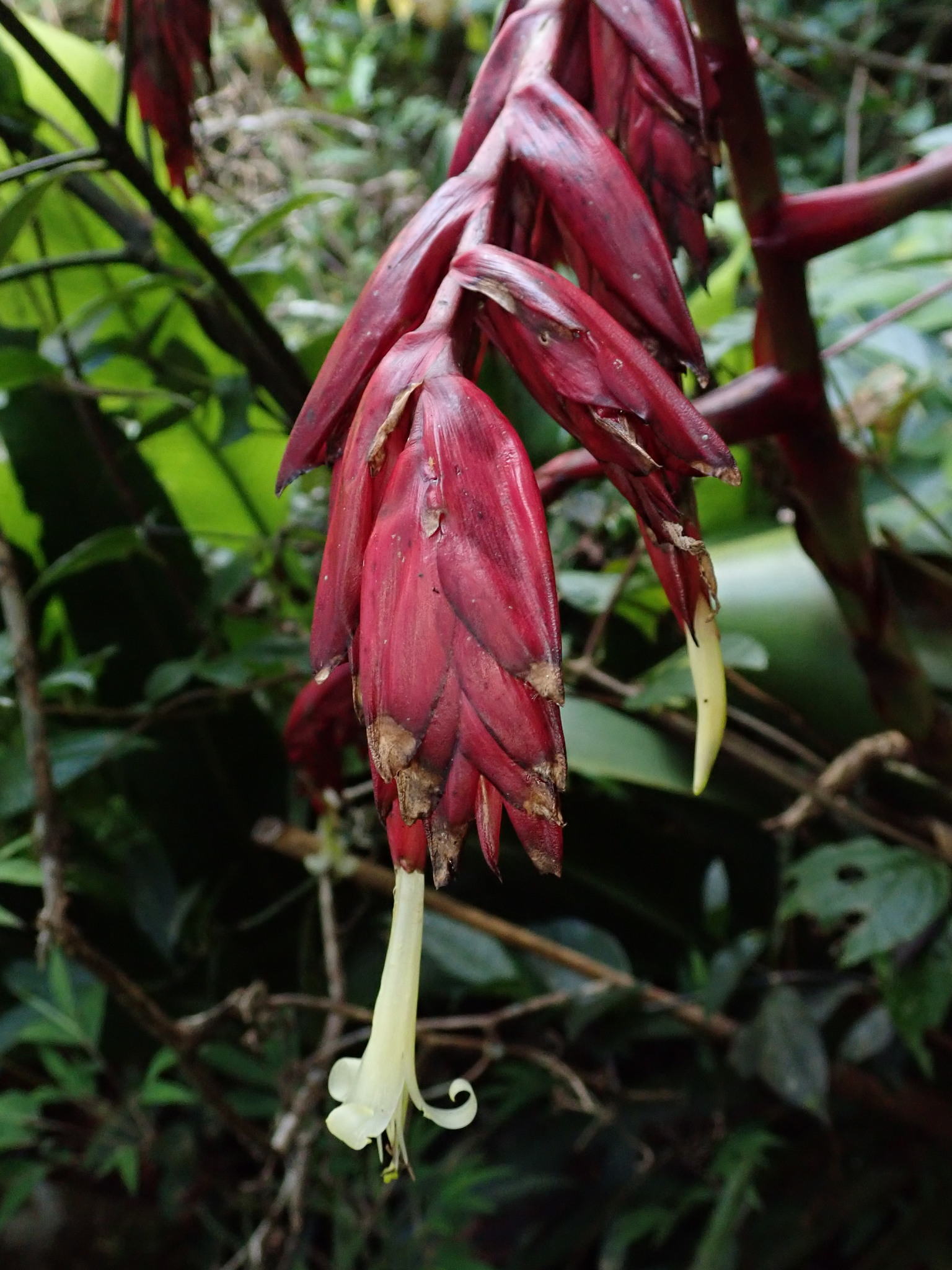
- G. fulgens

Scientific classification
- Kingdom: Plantae
- Clade: Tracheophytes
- Clade: Angiosperms
- Clade: Monocots
- Clade: Commelinids
- Order: Poales
- Family: Bromeliaceae
- Subfamily: Tillandsioideae
- Genus: Gregbrownia; W.Till & Barfuss

= Gregbrownia =

Genus of plants

Gregbrownia is a genus of flowering plants belonging to the family Bromeliaceae.

It is native to Ecuador and northern Peru.

The genus name of Gregbrownia is in honour of Gregory K. Brown (b. 1951), an American botanist and specialist in Bromeliaceae.

It was first described and published in Phytotaxa vol.279 on page 40 in 2016.

Known species, according to Kew:

- Gregbrownia brownii (H.Luther) W.Till & Barfuss, syn. Mezobromelia brownii H.Luther
- Gregbrownia fulgens (L.B.Sm.) W.Till & Barfuss, syn. Mezobromelia fulgens L.B.Sm.
- Gregbrownia hutchisonii (L.B.Sm.) W.Till & Barfuss, syn. Mezobromelia hutchisonii (L.B.Smi.) W.Weber & L.B.Sm.
- Gregbrownia lyman-smithii (Rauh & Barthlott) W.Till & Barfuss, syn. Mezobromelia lyman-smithii Rauh & Barthlott
