= Secchi disk =

Tool used to measure water transparency/turbidity

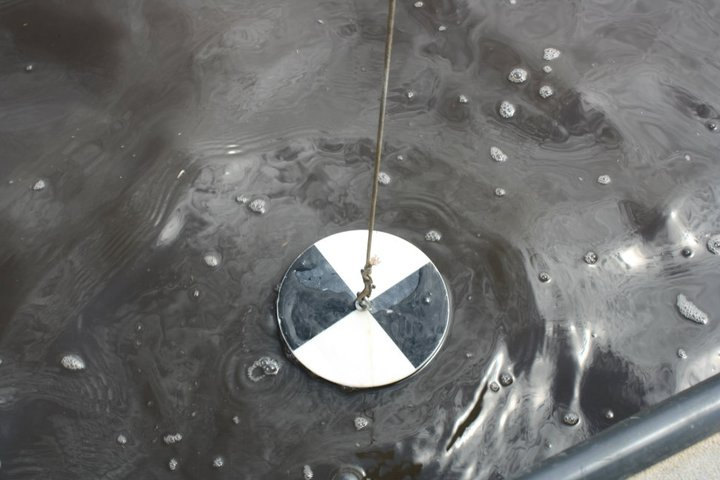
A Secchi disk being lowered into the water of a lake

The modified Secchi disk design used in fresh water

The Secchi disk (or Secchi disc), as created in 1865 by Angelo Secchi, is a plain white, circular disk 30 cm (12 in) in diameter used to measure water transparency or turbidity in bodies of water. The disc is mounted on a pole or line and lowered slowly down in the water. The depth at which the disk is no longer visible is taken as a measure of the transparency of the water. This measure is known as the Secchi depth and is related to water turbidity. Since its invention, the disk has also been used in a modified, smaller 20 cm (8 in) diameter, black-and-white design to measure freshwater transparency.

Similar disks, with a black-and-yellow pattern, are used as fiducial markers on vehicles in crash tests, crash-test dummies, and other kinetic experiments.

== History ==
The original Secchi disk was a plain white disk and was used in the Mediterranean Sea. A plain white, 30 cm (12 in) diameter Secchi disk remains the standard design used in marine studies. In 1899, George C. Whipple modified the original all-white Secchi disk to "...a disc about 8 inches in diameter, divided into quadrants painted alternately black and white like the target of a level-rod...". This modified black-and-white Secchi disk is the standard disk used in limnology (freshwater) investigations.

== Secchi depth ==
Different kinds of Secchi disks. A marine style on the left and the freshwater version on the right

The Secchi depth is reached when the reflectance equals the intensity of light backscattered from the water. 1.7 divided by this depth in metres yields an attenuation coefficient (also called an extinction coefficient), for the available light averaged over the Secchi disk depth. While used as a variable, the extinction coefficient is also used as a variable for turbidity. The light attenuation coefficient, k, can then be used in a form of the Beer–Lambert law,
$${I_z \over I_0}= e^{-kz},$$
to estimate I_{z}, the intensity of light at depth z from I_{0}, the intensity of light at the ocean surface.

The Secchi disk readings do not provide an exact measure of transparency, as there can be errors because of the sun's glare on the water, or one person may see the disk at one depth, but another person with better eyesight may see it at a greater depth. However, it is an inexpensive and straightforward method of measuring water clarity. Because of the potential for variation between users, methods should be standardized as much as possible.

A Secchi disk measurement should always be taken off the shady side of a boat or dock between 9:00 and 15:00. The period for best results is between 10:00 and 14:00. The same observer should take Secchi depth measurements, in the same manner, every time. One can approach the measurement by lowering the disk beyond a point of disappearance, then raising it and lowering it slightly to set the Secchi depth. Another method is to record the depth at which the disk disappears, lower it another few feet, then record the depth at which the disk reappears as it is slowly brought up. The Secchi depth is taken as the average of the two values.

Secchi disk measurements do not indicate how attenuation changes with depth or particular wavelengths of light. Submarine photometers can operate at depths of 150 m (492 ft) and can record visible, ultraviolet, and infrared parts of the spectrum. Turbidimeters and Transmissometers have their own light sources and can measure transparency with scientific accuracy.

== Applications ==
Secchi disk measurements have been an integral component of Minnesota's and Wisconsin's lake water quality assessment programs for some time; lake residents make periodic measurements and submit their readings to state and local agencies. The aggregated longitudinal data are used to reveal general trends in water quality. Similarly, the Indiana Clean Lakes Program trains and relies on volunteers to monitor turbidity in over 80 Indiana lakes using Secchi disks, and uses data submitted by volunteers to monitor lake quality in the state.

In 2013, a team of marine scientists established the global citizen science Secchi Disk program for seafarers to study marine phytoplankton. This ongoing citizen science Secchi Disk study combines the traditional plain white, 30 cm diameter marine Secchi Disk with mobile technology to upload Secchi depth data collected from the sea to a central database. The study's first scientific results were published in 2017. The Secchi Disk study was begun in response to a controversial scientific report that suggested the phytoplankton that influences water transparency had declined by 40% in the oceans between the years 1950 and 2008.

== See also ==
- Forel-Ule scale
- Siemens star
- Trophic state index
- Water quality
