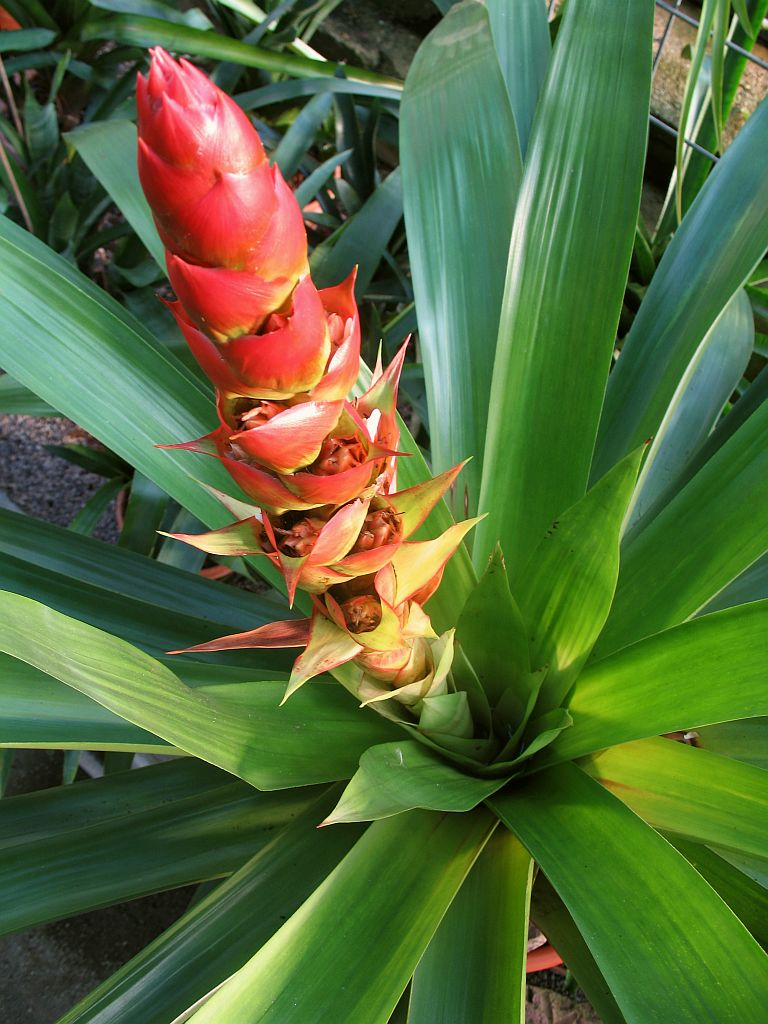

Scientific classification
- Kingdom: Plantae
- Clade: Tracheophytes
- Clade: Angiosperms
- Clade: Monocots
- Clade: Commelinids
- Order: Poales
- Family: Bromeliaceae
- Subfamily: Tillandsioideae
- Genus: Mezobromelia
- Species: M. capituligera

Binomial name
- Mezobromelia capituligera (Griseb.) J.R.Grant

Synonyms
- Tillandsia capituligera Griseb.; Cipuropsis capituligera (Griseb.) Christenh. & Byng; Guzmania capituligera (Griseb.) Mez; Schlumbergeria capituligera (Griseb.) Harms; Thecophyllum capituligerum (Griseb.) L.B.Sm.; Vriesea capituligera (Griseb.) L.B.Sm. & Pittendr.; Tillandsia fastuosa André; Guzmania fastuosa (André) Mez; Guzmania harrisii Mez; Guzmania sodiroana Mez; Tillandsia brigittalis E.H.L.Krause; Schlumbergeria fastuosa (André) Harms; Thecophyllum fastuosum (André) Mez

= Mezobromelia capituligera =

Species of plant

Mezobromelia capituligera is a plant species in the genus Mezobromelia. This species is native to West Indies (Cuba, Hispaniola, Jamaica, Trinidad, Leeward Islands) and northern South America (Venezuela, Colombia, Ecuador, Peru).
