= Forel–Ule scale =

Method to determine the color of bodies of water

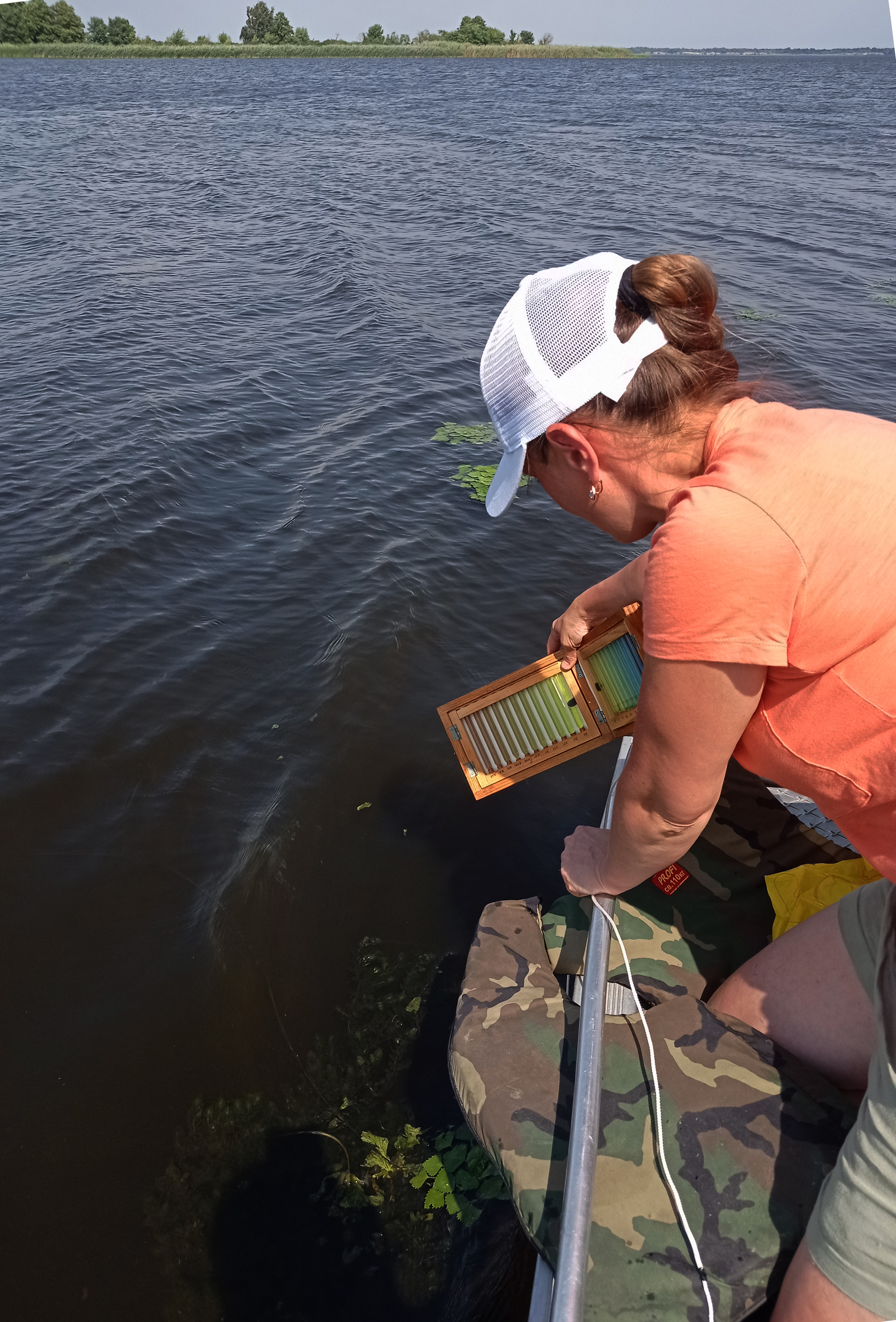
A researcher uses a Forel-Ule scale to measure the transparency and color of water in Kyiv and Kaniv reservoirs, Ukraine.

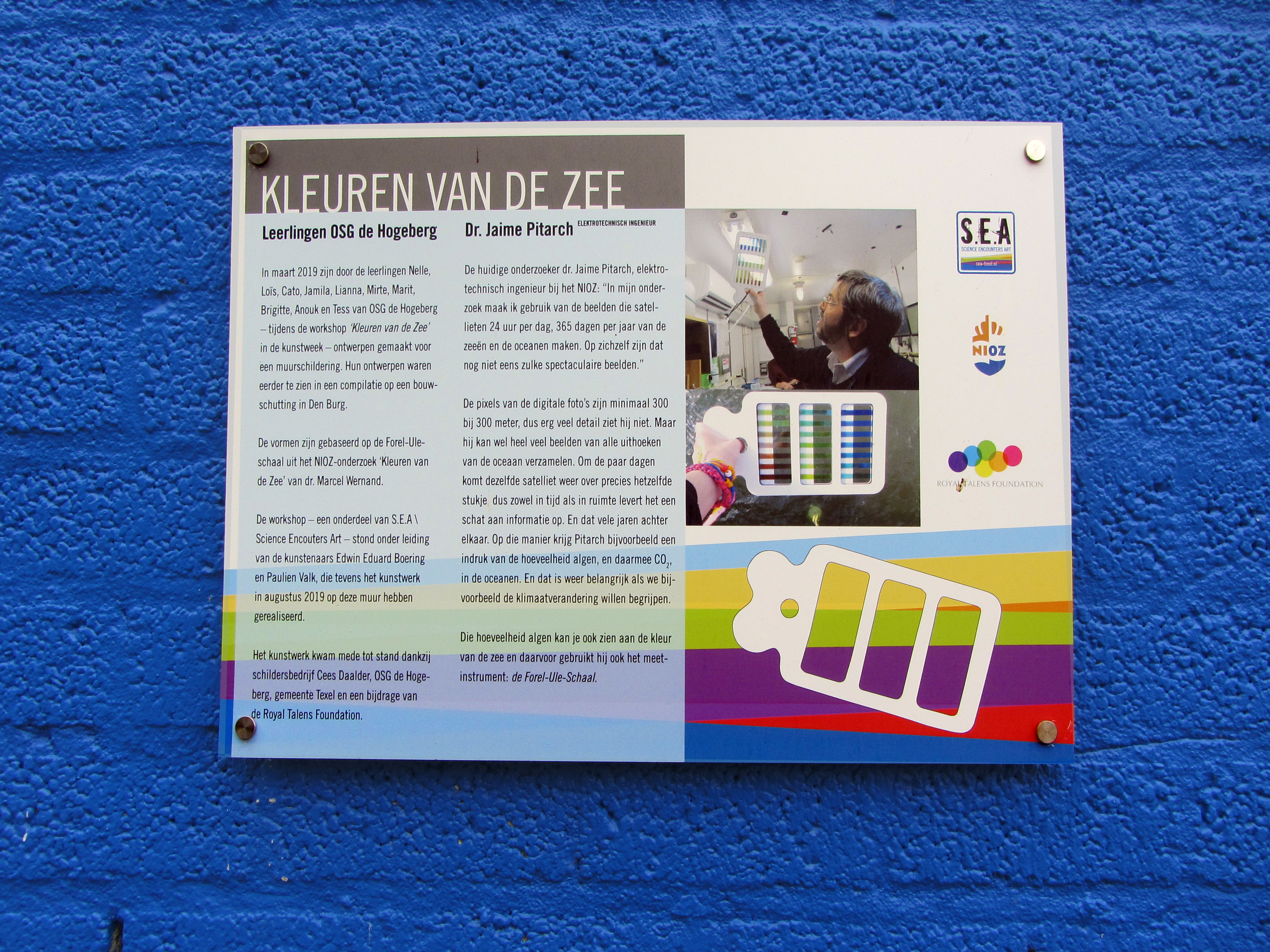
Illustration of the Forel-Ule Scale on a pamphlet titled "Colors of the Sea" in Dutch.

The Forel–Ule scale is a method to estimate the color of bodies of water. The scale provides a visual estimate of the color of a body of water, and it is used in limnology and oceanography with the aim of measuring the water's transparency and classifying its biological activity, dissolved substances, and suspended sediments.

The color scale of 21 different colors can be created using either a set of liquid vials or a set of color lighting filters in a white frame.

The classic Forel-Ule Scale uses a set of liquid vials of multiple colors. Together, the liquid vials represent a standardized color palette created by using a set of small transparent glass tubes containing colored water by adding different concentrations of stable inorganic salts. By mixing different chemicals (distilled water, ammonia, copper sulfate, potassium chromate, and cobalt sulfate) a standard color scale is produced in a set of numbered vials (1–21). The set of vials is then compared with the color of the water body. The result is a color index for the water body which gives an indication of the transparency of the water and thus helps to classify overall biological activity. The color gradations correspond to open sea and lake water colors, as they appear to an observer ashore or on board a vessel. The method is often used in conjunction with the Secchi disk submerged to half the Secchi depth, so that the color can be judged against a white background.

A set of color lighting filters against a white background can also be used as a Forel–Ule scale, called a Modern FU plastic scale. High-quality lighting filters of many colors are combined with one another to create the 21 colors of the traditional Forel-Ule Scale when viewed against a white background, such as white plexiglass.

== History ==
The method was developed by François-Alphonse Forel and was three years later extended with greenish brown to dark brown colors by the German limnologist Wilhelm Ule. The Forel Ule scale was a simple but adequate scale to classify the color of rivers, lakes, seas and oceans. The Forel–Ule scale observations, along with temperature, salinity, bathymetry, and Secchi depth, are some of the oldest oceanographic parameters dating back to the 1800s.

== Role in citizen science ==
In the Netherlands, a project called the Citizen's observatory for Coast and Ocean Optical Monitoring (Citclops) project has begun crowdsourcing water color measurements from citizen scientists. Citizen scientists estimate the color of the water with the Forel–Ule scale using a smartphone app called "Eye on water."

== See also ==
- Citizen science
- Color of water
- Munsell color system
- Ocean color
- Pt/Co scale
- Secchi disk
- Water quality
