= Wilhelm Ule =

German geographer (1861–1940)

- Born: May 9, 1861; Halle, Kingdom of Prussia
- Died: February 13, 1940 (aged 78); Rostock, Nazi Germany
- Scientific career
- Fields: Geography
- Thesis: Die Mansfelder Seen (1888)

Wilhelm Ule, sometimes referred to as Willi Ule (9 May 1861 in Halle an der Saale – 13 February 1940) was a German geographer and limnologist. He was the son of science writer Otto Eduard Vincenz Ule (1820-1876).

He studied mathematics and geography in Berlin and Halle, where he graduated in 1888 with a dissertation on the lakes of Mansfeld, Die Mansfelder Seen. The following year he obtained his habilitation with a study on the depth ratios of Masurian lakes. In 1889 he also became managing director of the Academy of Sciences Leopoldina.

In 1907 he became an associate professor at the University of Rostock, where in 1919 he was appointed full professor. He was editor of the Geographischen Arbeite and the Mitteilungen der geographischen Gesellschaft zu Rostock (Releases of the Geographical Society of Rostock). Ule is sometimes referred to as "the founder of geography in Mecklenburg".

With Swiss scientist François-Alphonse Forel (1841-1912), he was co-creator of the "Forel-Ule scale", a method used for obtaining an approximate measurement of surface water color.

== Selected writings ==
- Der Würmsee (Starnbergersee) in Oberbayern. Eine limnologische studie, 1901 - The Würmsee (Starnberg) in Upper Bavaria, a limnological study.
- Bodengestalt und Gewässer, 1907 - Geology and groundwater.
- Geographie von Mecklenburg, 1909 - Geography of Mecklenburg.
- Das Deutsche Reich; eine geographische landeskunde, 1915 - The German Empire, geographic area studies.
- Quer durch Süd Amerika, 1924 - Across South America.
- Physiogeographie des Süßwasser: Grundwasser, Quellen, Flüsse, Seen, 1925 - Physical geography of fresh water : groundwater, springs, rivers, lakes.
- Asien, Australien und die Südseeinseln, Amerika, die Polarländer, 1928 - Asia, Australia and the South Sea Islands, America and Polar regions.
- Mecklenburg, 1930.
