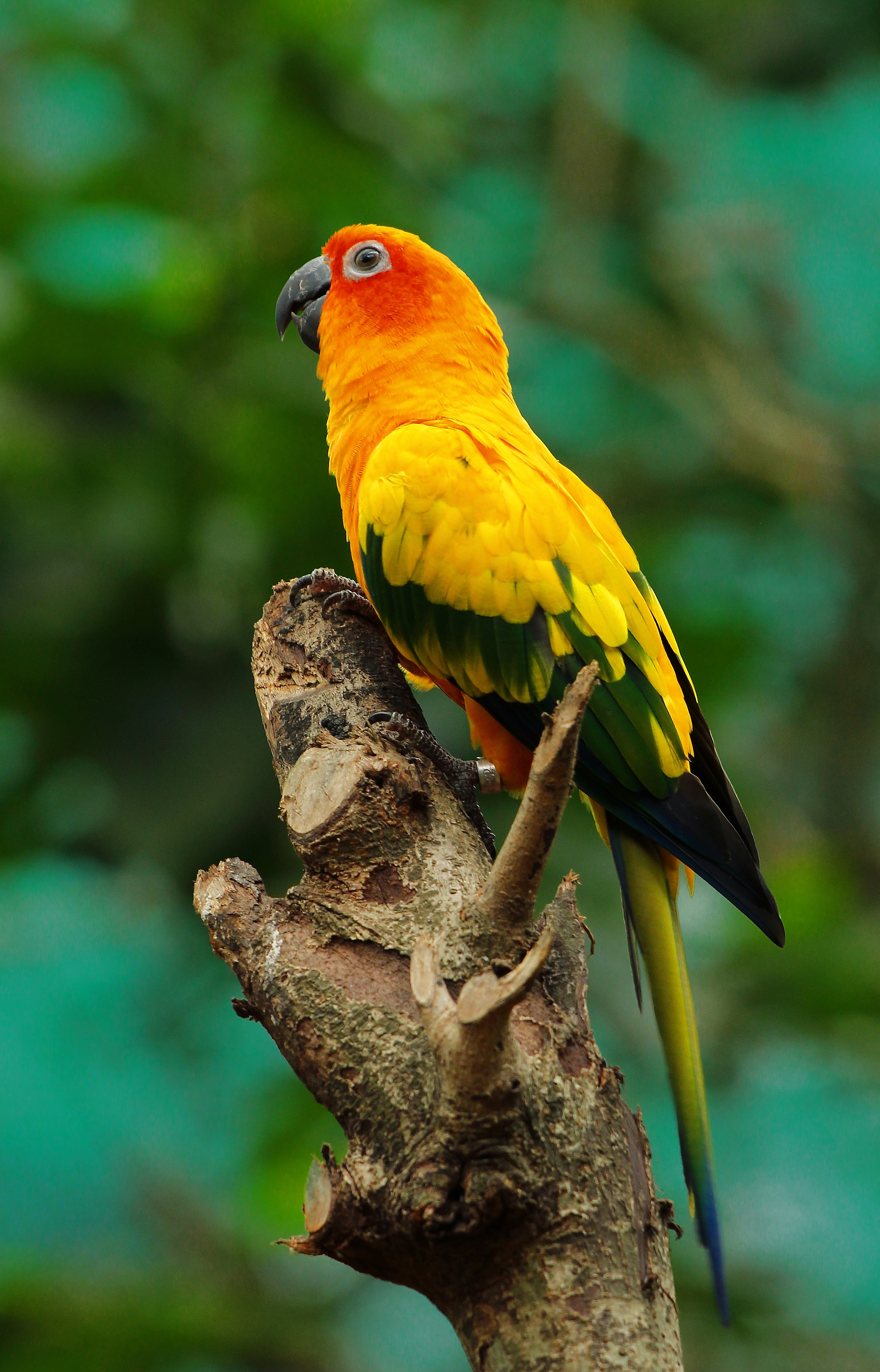
- Sun conure (Aratinga solstitialis)

Scientific classification
- Kingdom: Animalia
- Phylum: Chordata
- Class: Aves
- Order: Psittaciformes
- Family: Psittacidae
- Subfamily: Arinae

Groups included
- Aratinga; Pyrrhura; Eupsittula; Psittacara; †Conuropsis; Cyanoliseus; Enicognathus; Guarouba; Leptosittaca; Ognorhynchus; Thectocercus; Myiopsitta?; Brotogeris?; Rhynchopsitta?; Pionites?; Deroptyus?

Cladistically included but traditionally excluded taxa
- Androglossini?; Anodorhynchus; Diopsittaca; Orthopsittaca; Ara; Primolius

= Conure =

Group of small to medium-sized parrots

Conures are a diverse, loosely defined group of small to medium-sized parrots. They belong to several genera within a long-tailed group of the New World parrot subfamily Arinae. Most conures belong to the tribe Arini, though Myiopsitta is an exception. The term "conure" is used primarily in bird keeping, though it has appeared in some scientific journals. The American Ornithologists' Union uses the generic term parakeet for all species elsewhere called conure, though Joseph Forshaw, a prominent Australian ornithologist, uses conure.

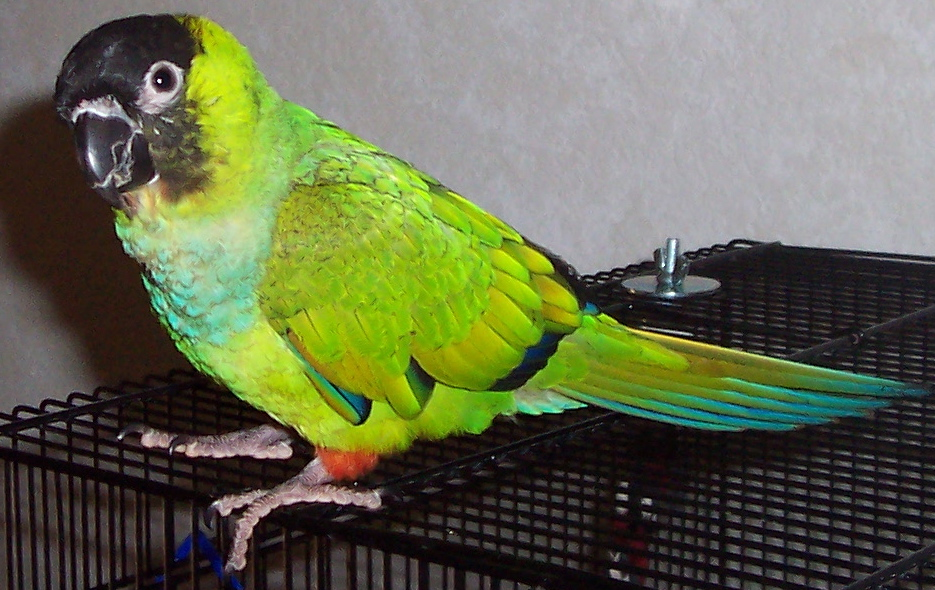
Nanday conure

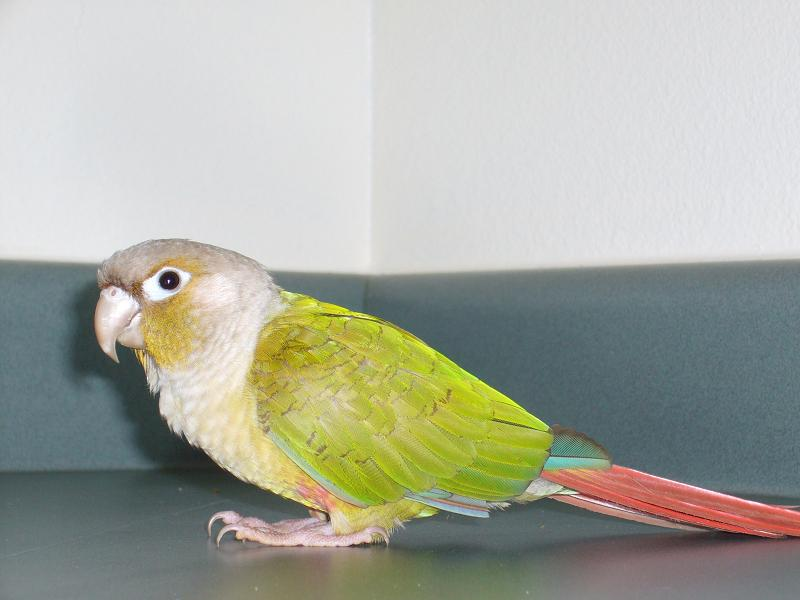
Cinnamon green-cheeked conure

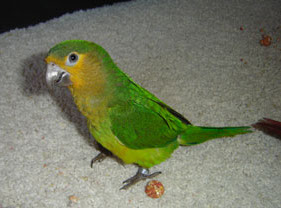
St Thomas conure

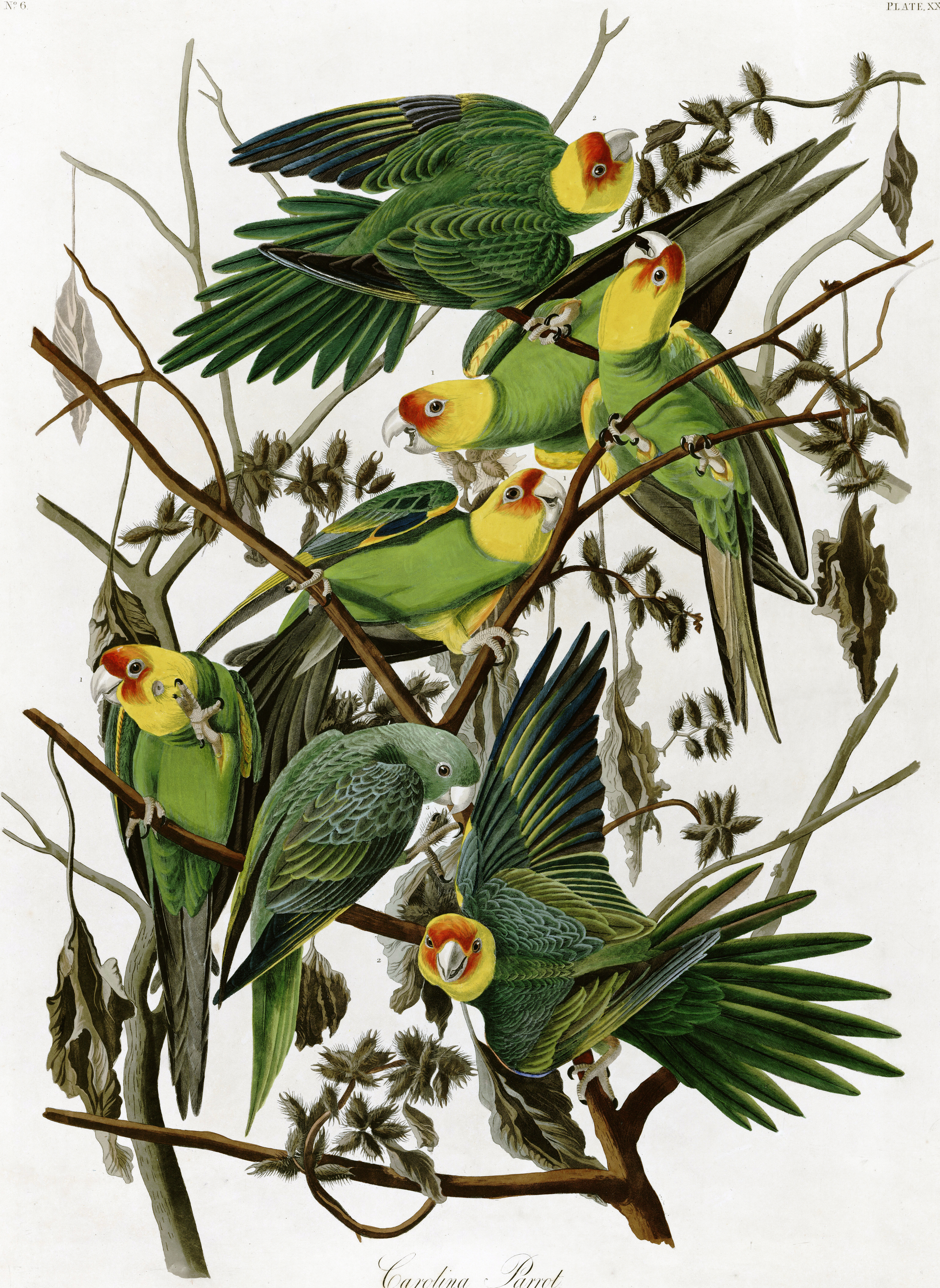
Extinct Carolina parakeet

== Description ==
Conures are either large parakeets or small parrots found in the Western Hemisphere. They are analogous in size and way of life to Afro-Eurasia's rose-ringed parakeets or the Australian parakeets. All living conure species live in Central and South America. The extinct Conuropsis carolinensis, or Carolina parakeet was an exception. Conures are often called the clowns of the parrot world due to their constant attention seeking behavior including hanging upside-down and swaying back and forth or "dancing".

Despite being large for parakeets, conures are lightly built with long tails and small (but strong) beaks. Conure beaks always have a small cere and are usually horn-colored (gray) or black. Most conure species live in flocks of 20 or more birds. Conures often eat grain, and so are treated as agricultural pests in some places.

Conures are as diverse a group as African parrots, so trying to characterize them all is difficult and inaccurate. The category conure is loosely defined because they do not currently constitute a natural, scientific grouping. The term conure is now used mostly in aviculture. Scientists tend to refer to these birds as "parrots" or "parakeets". The sun conure is one of the few species that is regularly called a conure even in scientific texts. (See below under Scientific classification for more details.)

== Species ==
Conures, as the term is used by aviculturists, include only the genera Aratinga, Pyrrhura, Eupsittula and Psittacara, as well as several single-species genera and one two-species genus. Not all members of these genera are called "conures" with equal frequency; some are more often referred to as parakeets. These other genera are listed below:

- Conuropsis: Carolina parakeet (extinct)
- Cyanoliseus: Patagonian conure
- Enicognathus: austral and slender-billed conures
- Guarouba: golden or Queen Of Bavaria conure
- Leptosittaca: golden-plumed conure
- Ognorhynchus: yellow-eared conure
- Thectocercus: blue-crowned conure

=== Aratinga ===
Old Tupi for "bright macaw", (ara – "macaw", tinga "bright") the Aratinga conures generally seem to have a more mischievous personality than the real little macaws or mini-macaws. Popular as pets, the Aratinga conures are generally larger than other conure species with brighter plumage and are generally the noisier, more outgoing, and more demanding of the two primary conure genera. The colorful sun conure and jandaya parakeet are among the species of conures more commonly kept as pets. Many of the Aratinga species can be quite loud, but otherwise can make very good pets for responsible owners. Their lifespans are 20–30 years.

Nanday conures (Aratinga nenday) have a distinctive black head, and wings and tails tipped with dark-blue feathers. They have a light-blue scarf and bright-orange feathers on their legs and around their vents. The maturity of a nanday can be told by the edges of its black hood; if the hood has a ragged edge of brown, then the bird is over a year old. Nandays are often extremely noisy; they are a heavily flock-oriented species, used to making their demands known, calling out warnings for the group, and calling to members of the group that are out of sight. They are also extremely social and intelligent birds, capable of learning tricks, mimicking sounds, and learning a decent vocabulary. At least one report suggests that they are highly adaptable to human encroachment on their territories, but the exact status of the species in the wild is unknown.

Flocks of nanday conures live wild in parts of Florida, notably the west coast, including areas of St. Petersburg and Clearwater. Additionally, flocks of wild Nanday conures live in Siesta Key, Sarasota, Florida. A large flock of nanday conures lives in the Pacific Palisades neighborhood of Los Angeles. They have been in the area for the past several years.

Golden-capped conures (Aratinga auricapillus)—also known as golden-capped parakeets—are native to Brazil and Paraguay. Their natural habitats include subtropical or tropical dry forest, subtropical or tropical moist lowland forest, dry savanna, and plantations. The existence of this conure is threatened by habitat loss. However, golden-capped conures are prolific breeders, making them popular birds in aviculture, and hand-fed young are generally available.

Golden-capped conures grow to about 13 to 14 inches (330 to 360 mm) in length and weigh about 150 grams (5.3 oz). Their bodies are mainly green with blackish bills, gray feet, and brown irises. The forehead, the areas around the eyes, and underwing coverts are usually red. The breast feathers are a red and green mix. Their tail feathers are olive green with a bluish tip. The primary feathers, wing coverts, and under wing coverts are blue.

Immature golden-capped conures are mostly green, with some orange around the eyes, above the beak, and on the breast near the wings. Some navy is mixed in with the green of the tail. The birds' full colorations are not seen until they are sexually mature at about two years of age. Their lifespan is about 30 years.

=== Pyrrhura ===
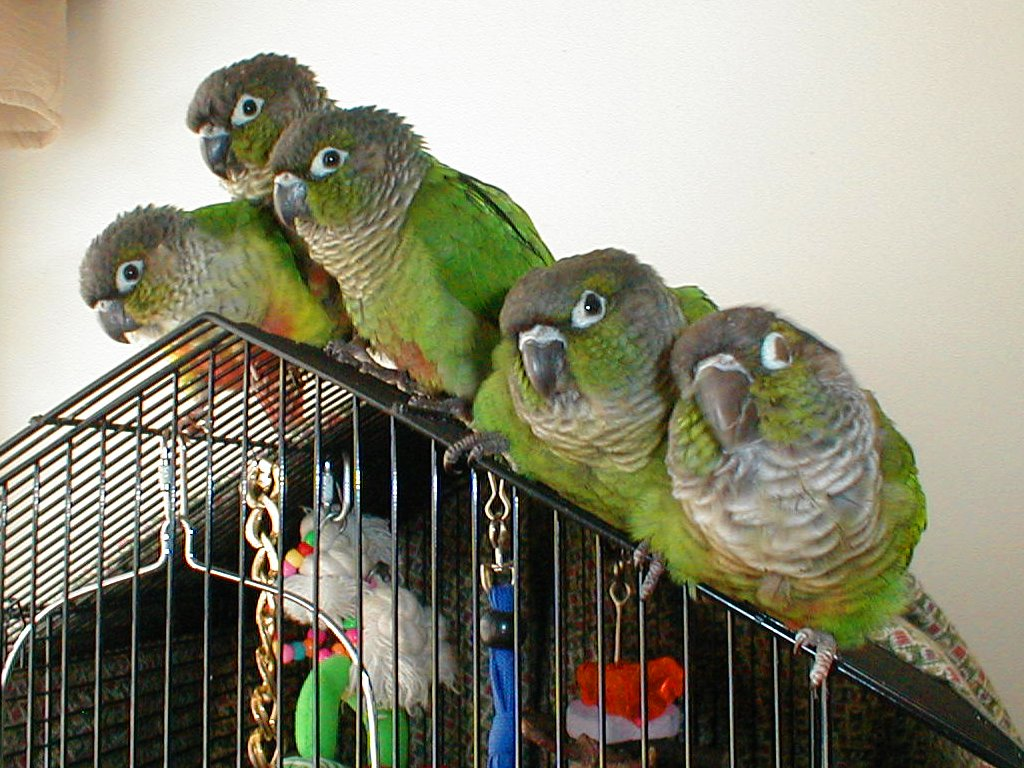
A family of green-cheeked conures

Pyrrhura is the other prominent genus of conures. These conures (with generally more green colors) include the very common green-cheeked conure, maroon-bellied conure, pearly conure, black-capped conure, painted conure, crimson-bellied conure, and a number of other species. They are usually smaller, have more subdued colors, and are much quieter than the Aratinga conures. Pyrrhura species are growing in popularity as pet birds, primarily due to their quiet nature (relative to comparable companion parrots), their affectionate and intelligent personalities, and the increasing number of color mutations developed in several of these species. Pyrrhura conures typically live around 20 or 25 years. To reach full maturity, many of them molt to rid themselves of feathers from previous growth stages, and occasionally, young birds pluck their feathers during the winter. These birds in captivity have been observed using their feathers to scratch themselves.

=== Psittacara ===
Until 2013, all Psittacara conures were part of the genus Aratinga. Included here are common pet species such as the red-masked parakeet (or cherry-headed conure) and mitred parakeet. All members of Psittacara are predominantly green parrots, with some species having areas of red plumage.

=== Eupsittula ===
As with the Psittacara species, the parrots now contained within the genus Eupsittula - including the familiar orange-fronted parakeet (or half-moon conure) were included in Aratinga until 2013.

=== Golden conure ===
The golden conure or Queen of Bavaria conure, Guaruba guarouba (recently reclassified from Aratinga guarouba) is, as the name implies, covered all over with bright yellow feathers, except for the green wing-tip feathers and the greyish horn-colored beak. Golden conures are among the most expensive conures both to purchase and to care for, although many owners feel that the benefits outweigh the cost. It is one of the rarest conures in the wild in addition to the pet trade. Many experts believe that these birds should not be kept in captivity unless in a breeding program.

=== Patagonian conure ===
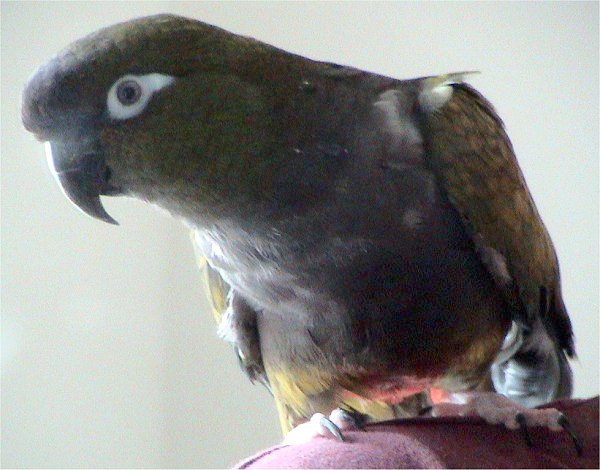
Patagonian conure, Cyanoliseus patagonus

The Patagonian conure, also known as the burrowing parrot, Cyanoliseus patagonus, is the largest conure. It is found in the Patagonia region of south-central Argentina and Chile. Drab on the top, brightly colored underneath, the Patagonian conure has increased in popularity since the 1990s, leading to an increase in illegal importation that threatens wild populations, but they are fairly commonly bred in captivity. Patagonian conures have a reputation for being exceptionally sweet-natured and intelligent, but can be very loud and destructive with their chewing. The greater Patagonian conure (C. p. bloxami or C. p. byroni) is the largest of all the conures. They can learn to talk and they usually bond very well with people, especially if hand-raised, and although not the most colorful bird, they make great pets.

=== Enicognathus ===
This genus comprises the austral conure, Enicognathus ferrugineus, which is native to the southern tip of South America and the slender-billed conure, E. leptorhynchus, endemic to Chile.

=== Golden-plumed conure ===
The golden-plumed conure, also called the golden-plumed parakeet, Leptosittaca branickii, is a small Andean conure not found in aviculture and endangered in its own habitat.

=== Yellow-eared conure ===
The exceedingly rare yellow-eared conure or Ognorhynchus icterotis of Colombia and Ecuador, was never common in aviculture and has not successfully bred in captivity.

=== Carolina parakeet ===
Conuropsis carolinensis, the Carolina parakeet, was one of only two parrot species endemic to the United States in recorded history. The Carolina parakeet was a remarkably social bird, living in vast flocks. American bird hunters reported that Carolina parakeets would return to mourn dead members of the flock, making themselves easy targets. Considered a pest, popular in the pet trade, and bearing plume feathers valued for hats, this species was hunted to extinction around the beginning of the 1900s.

== Scientific classification ==
The word "conure" is an old term that originally described members of the no longer used genus Conurus, which included members of Aratinga and Pyrrhura.

The parrot order, Psittaciformes, is a tangle of genera, many containing only one species. Parrots include about 353 species—generally grouped into two families - the Cacatuidae or cockatoos, and the Psittacidae or true parrots. The term parrot generally applies both to the entire order and to Psittacidae alone.

All members of the order Psittaciformes have a characteristic curved beak shape with the upper mandible having slight mobility in the joint with the skull and a generally erect stance. All parrots are zygodactyl—meaning they have four toes on each foot, two that face front and two that face back.

Conures and all other New World parrots are often placed in a subfamily or tribe Arinae. Internal relationships of conures are poorly understood, though it seems evident that to make them a natural grouping, the quaker parakeet, the thick-billed parrot, and Brotogeris should be included, and often are. Neotropical parrots, macaws, and other are also candidates potential for inclusion. In this scheme, "conure" comprises members of the genera:

- Aratinga
- Pyrrhura
- Nandayus (now an Aratinga species)
- Guarouba (Queen of Bavaria conure)
- Cyanoliseus
- Enicognathus
- Leptosittaca
- Ognorhynchus
- Conuropsis
- Rhynchopsitta: thick-billed parrot
- Myopsitta: Monk parakeet

Macaws:

- Ara
- Anodorhynchus
- Cyanopsitta
- Diopsittaca
- Orthopsittaca
- Primolius

The caiques and the hawk-headed parrot have also been proposed for inclusion, though both have a heavier build and different tail structure from traditional conures.

== Non-native colonies ==
Conures are highly adaptable to urban environments, and several non-native colonies have been observed globally. The exact origins of such colonies are generally unverifiable.

=== Hawaii ===
A colony of cherry-headed conures lives around the slopes of Diamond Head.

There also appears to be at least one colony living on the west side of the Big Island of Hawaii.

=== Seattle, Washington ===
A conure colony lives in Seward Park.

=== San Francisco, California ===
A colony of cherry-headed conures lives on Telegraph Hill, San Francisco. They are the subject of a film, The Wild Parrots of Telegraph Hill, based on a story by Mark Bittner. Flocks of conures can be seen and heard in many other areas of San Francisco such as the Tenderloin district and Alamo Square.

=== Santa Clara County, California ===
Multiple colonies of cherry-headed and/or mitred conures thrive in and around Santa Clara County. In particular Sunnyvale, Cupertino (especially around the Apple Campus), and Palo Alto.

=== Los Angeles, California ===
Multiple colonies of cherry-headed conures live in the San Gabriel Valley (the suburbs northeast of Los Angeles). Subtropical U.S. cities such as Los Angeles are great environments for tropical birds because of all the tropical plants that are cultivated as ornamentals, providing them with their natural food supply. Flocks of 50 or more descend on fruit trees during their bearing season, staying for a few days and making a deafening racket. During mating season, they build nests in the palm trees that line many streets in the region.

Three species of conures (genus Aratinga) have formed non-native colonies in California. These are documented by the California Parrot Project in affiliation with the Natural History Museum of Los Angeles County, and in cooperation with the Pasadena Audubon Society.

=== Long Beach, California ===
A colony of half-moon conures has been observed in the Belmont Shore area of Long Beach, California, since the late 1980s.

=== Delray Beach, Florida ===
A least one wild pair of nandays has been spotted in downtown Delray Beach, Florida. The total number of birds in the colony is yet undetermined.

=== Quakers ===
The Quaker (which may or may not be a conure) can be found in many states. Quakers are also illegal to own in many US states, as they are known to build very large nests on powerlines (Quakers are the only parrots that build nests).

== In media ==
- A blue-crowned conure was the titular star of the family movie Paulie. The film used 14 different birds.
