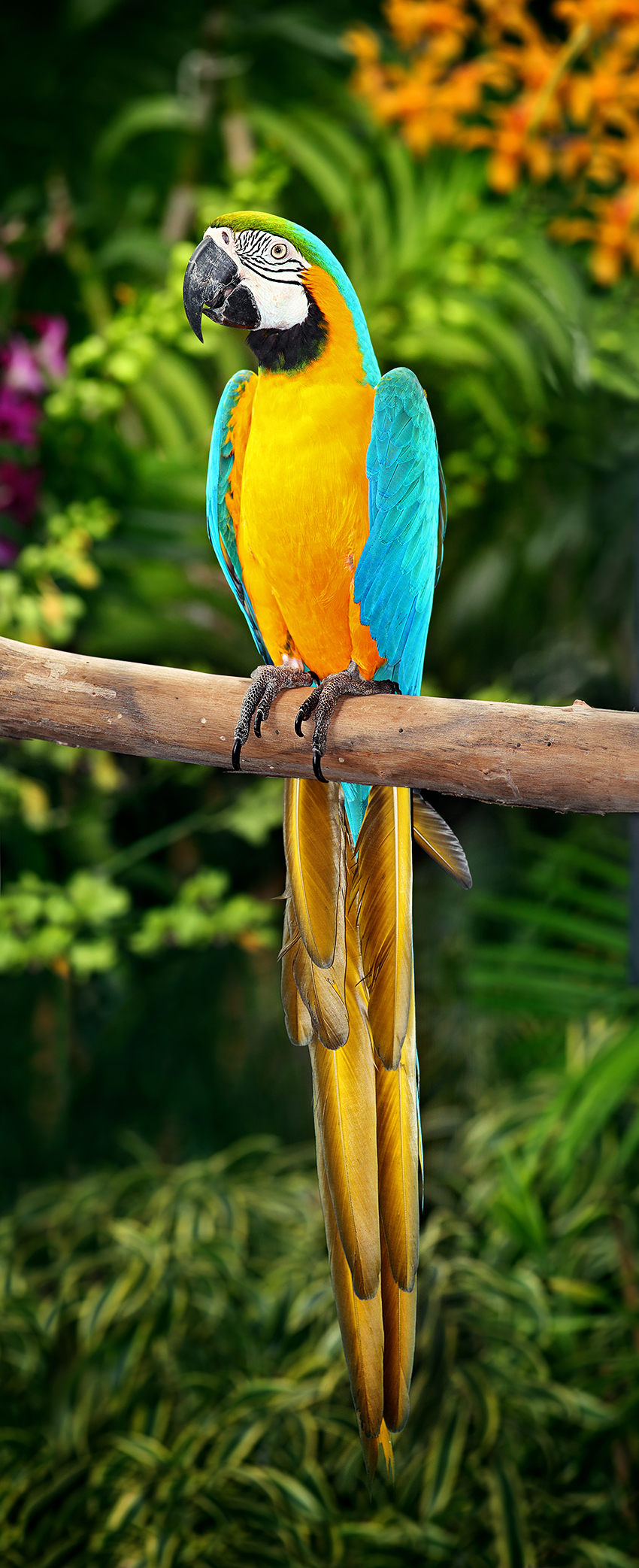
- Blue-and-yellow macaw

Scientific classification
- Kingdom: Animalia
- Phylum: Chordata
- Class: Aves
- Order: Psittaciformes
- Family: Psittacidae
- Subfamily: Arinae
- Tribe: Arini; G.R. Gray, 1840

Genera
- Anodorhynchus; Ara; Aratinga; Cyanoliseus; Cyanopsitta; Diopsittaca; Enicognathus; Eupsittula; Guaruba; Leptosittaca; Ognorhynchus; Orthopsittaca; Primolius; Psittacara; Pyrrhura; Rhynchopsitta; Thectocercus †Conuropsis

= Arini (tribe) =

Clade of birds

The Arini tribe of the neotropical parrots is a monophyletic clade of macaws and parakeets (commonly called conures in aviculture) characterized by colorful plumage and long, tapering tails. They occur throughout Mexico, Central America, and South America, the Caribbean and the southern United States. One genus and several species are extinct; another genus is extinct in the wild. Two species are known only through subfossil remains. About a dozen hypothetical extinct species (see Extinct Caribbean macaws) have been described, native to the Caribbean area. Among the Arini are some of the rarest birds in the world, such as Spix's macaw, which is extinct in the wild – fewer than 100 specimens survive in captivity. It also contains the largest flighted parrot in the world, the hyacinth macaw. Some species, such as the blue-and-yellow macaw and sun conure are popular pet parrots.

Molecular studies have dated the divergence of the Arini tribe from the ancestral neotropical parrots to late in the Paleogene period about 30–35 million years ago.

== Taxonomy ==
The Arini are one of three recognized clades in subfamily Arinae of neotropical parrots in the family Psittacidae of Afrotropical and neotropical parrots, one of three families of true parrots.

Image	Genus	Living species
	Anodorhynchus Spix, 1824	Hyacinth macaw, Anodorhynchus hyacinthinus; Lear's macaw, Anodorhynchus leari; Glaucous macaw, Anodorhynchus glaucus (possibly extinct)
	Cyanopsitta Bonaparte, 1854	Spix's macaw, Cyanopsitta spixii (extinct in the wild)
	Ara Lacépède, 1799	Blue-and-yellow macaw, Ara ararauna; Blue-throated macaw, Ara glaucogularis; Military macaw, Ara militaris; Great green macaw, Ara ambiguus; Scarlet macaw, Ara macao; Red-and-green (green-winged) macaw, Ara chloropterus; Cuban red macaw, Ara tricolor (extinct); Red-fronted macaw, Ara rubrogenys; Chestnut-fronted macaw, Ara severus; Saint Croix macaw, Ara autocthones (extinct)
	Orthopsittaca Ridgway, 1912	Red-bellied macaw, Orthopsittaca manilatus
	Primolius Bonaparte, 1857	Blue-headed macaw, Primolius couloni; Blue-winged macaw, Primolius maracana; Golden-collared macaw, Primolius auricollis
	Diopsittaca Ridgway, 1912	Red-shouldered macaw, Diopsittaca nobilis
	Rhynchopsitta Bonaparte, 1854	Thick-billed parrot, Rhynchopsitta pachyrhyncha; Maroon-fronted parrot, Rhynchopsitta terrisi; Rhynchopsitta phillipsi (extinct)
	Ognorhynchus Bonaparte, 1857	Yellow-eared parrot, Ognorhynchus icterotis
	Guaruba Lesson, 1830	Golden parakeet, Guaruba guarouba
	Leptosittaca Berlepsch & Stolzmann, 1894	Golden-plumed parakeet, Leptosittaca branickii
	Conuropsis† Salvadori, 1891	Carolina parakeet, Conuropsis carolinensis (extinct); Conuropsis fratercula (extinct, proposed genus Conuropsis contested, known from subfossil remains)
	Psittacara Vigors, 1825	Green parakeet, Psittacara holochlorus; Pacific parakeet, Psittacara strenuus; Socorro parakeet, Psittacara brevipes; Scarlet-fronted parakeet, Psittacara wagleri; Cordilleran parakeet, Psittacara frontatus; Mitred parakeet, Psittacara mitratus; Red-masked parakeet, Psittacara erythrogenys; Finsch's parakeet, Psittacara finschi; White-eyed parakeet, Psittacara leucophthalmus; Cuban parakeet, Psittacara euops; Hispaniolan parakeet, Psittacara chloropterus; Puerto Rican parakeet, Psittacara maugei (extinct)
	Aratinga Spix, 1824	Sun parakeet, Aratinga solstitialis; Sulphur-breasted parakeet, Aratinga maculata; Jandaya parakeet, Aratinga jandaya; Golden-capped parakeet, Aratinga auricapillus; Nanday parakeet, Aratinga nenday; Dusky-headed parakeet, Aratinga weddellii
	Eupsittula Bonaparte, 1853	Brown-throated parakeet, Eupsittula pertinax; Olive-throated parakeet, Eupsittula nana; Orange-fronted parakeet, Eupsittula canicularis; Peach-fronted parakeet, Eupsittula aurea; Cactus (Caatinga) parakeet, Eupsittula cactorum
	Thectocercus Vieillot, 1818	Blue-crowned parakeet, Thectocercus acuticaudatus
	Cyanoliseus Bonaparte, 1854	Burrowing parakeet, Cyanoliseus patagonus
	Pyrrhura Bonaparte, 1856	Ochre-marked parakeet, Pyrrhura cruentata; Maroon-bellied parakeet, Pyrrhura frontalis; Blaze-winged parakeet, Pyrrhura devillei; Crimson-bellied parakeet, Pyrrhura perlata; Pearly parakeet, Pyrrhura lepida; Green-cheeked parakeet, Pyrrhura molinae; Painted parakeet, Pyrrhura picta; Sinú parakeet, Pyrrhura (picta) subandina (possibly extinct); Todd's (Perijá) parakeet, Pyrrhura (picta) caeruleiceps; Azuero parakeet, Pyrrhura (picta) eisenmanni; Venezuelan parakeet, Pyrrhura emma; Santarém parakeet, Pyrrhura amazonum; Madeira parakeet, Pyrrhura (amazonum) snethlageae; Bonaparte's parakeet, Pyrrhura lucianii; Rose-fronted parakeet or red-crowned parakeet, Pyrrhura roseifrons; Wavy-breasted parakeet, Pyrrhura (roseifrons) peruviana; White-eared (maroon-faced) parakeet, Pyrrhura leucotis; Grey-breasted parakeet, Pyrrhura griseipectus; Pfrimer's parakeet, Pyrrhura pfrimeri; Fiery-shouldered parakeet, Pyrrhura egregia; Santa Marta parakeet, Pyrrhura viridicata; Maroon-tailed parakeet, Pyrrhura melanura; El Oro parakeet, Pyrrhura orcesi; Black-capped (rock) parakeet, Pyrrhura rupicola; White-necked parakeet, Pyrrhura albipectus; Flame-winged (brown-breasted) parakeet, Pyrrhura calliptera; Blood-eared parakeet, Pyrrhura hoematotis; Rose-headed (rose-crowned) parakeet, Pyrrhura rhodocephala; Sulphur-winged parakeet, Pyrrhura hoffmanni
	Enicognathus G.R. Gray, 1840	Austral parakeet, Enicognathus ferrugineus; Slender-billed parakeet, Enicognathus leptorhynchus

== See also ==
- List of parrots
- List of macaws
- List of Aratinga parakeets
