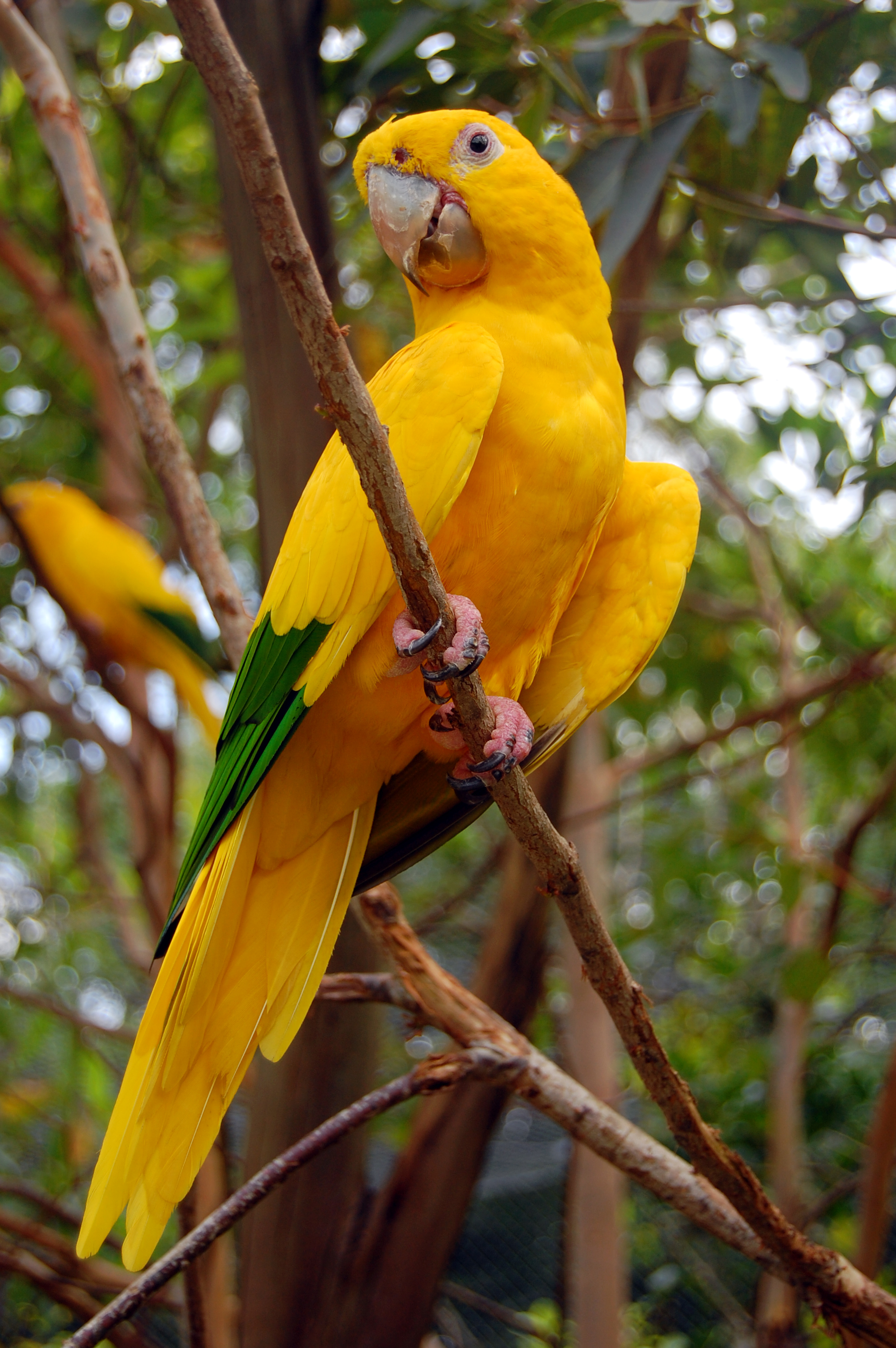
- At Gramado Zoo, Brazil

Conservation status
- Vulnerable (IUCN 3.1)
- CITES Appendix I

Scientific classification
- Kingdom: Animalia
- Phylum: Chordata
- Class: Aves
- Order: Psittaciformes
- Family: Psittacidae
- Tribe: Arini
- Genus: Guaruba; Lesson, 1830
- Species: G. guarouba

Binomial name
- Guaruba guarouba (Gmelin, JF, 1788)

Synonyms
- Psittacus guarouba Aratinga guarouba

= Golden parakeet =

Species of bird

The golden parakeet, golden conure, or Queen of Bavaria conure (Guaruba guarouba) is a medium-sized golden-yellow Neotropical parrot native to the Amazon Basin of interior northern Brazil. It is the only species placed in the genus Guaruba.

Its plumage is mostly bright yellow, hence its common name, but it also possesses green remiges. It lives in the drier, upland rainforests in Amazonian Brazil, and is threatened by deforestation and flooding, and also by the now-illegal trapping of wild individuals for the pet trade. It is listed on CITES appendix I.

== Taxonomy ==
The golden parakeet was listed in 1633 by the Dutch geographer Joannes de Laet in his History of the New World. He gave the local name as Guiarubas. De Laet included the parakeet in the 1640 French translation of his book. The word Guiarubas comes from the Tupi language: Guarajúba means "yellow bird". The golden parakeet was also described by the German naturalist Georg Marcgrave in 1648 in his Historia Naturalis Brasiliae. Marcgrave gave the local name as Quiivbatvi. Based on Marcgrave's description, the golden parakeet was included in the works of Francis Willughby in 1678, John Ray in 1713, and Mathurin Jacques Brisson in 1760. In 1779 the French polymath, the Comte de Buffon, included a description based on a preserved specimen in his Histoire Naturelle des Oiseaux. An illustration based on the same specimen was published separately.

When in 1788 the German naturalist Johann Friedrich Gmelin revised and expanded Carl Linnaeus's Systema Naturae he included the golden parakeet and cited earlier works including Buffon's description of "Le Guarouba". He placed it with the other parrots in the genus Psittacus and coined the binomial name Psittacus guarouba.

Formerly classified as Aratinga guarouba (Note: SACC 2005: 6. Guarouba was formerly (e.g., Peters 1937, Meyer de Schauensee 1970) included in Aratinga, but see Sick (1990), and also Tavares et al. (2004, 2006), Wright et al. (2008), and Kirchman et al. (2012), whose genetic data indicated that the sister genus to Guarouba is Diopsittaca, thus forcing a return to earlier classifications (e.g., Cory 1918, Pinto 1937) that treated it in a monotypic genus.) the golden parakeet is now the only species placed in the genus Guaruba that was introduced in 1830 by the French naturalist René Lesson. The different spellings of the genus and species names result from the different spellings used by Lesson and Gmelin and the rules of the International Commission on Zoological Nomenclature. Lesson initially used Guarouba but on subsequent pages changed this to Guaruba. The species is monotypic: no subspecies are recognised. This species is also known as the golden conure.

Molecular studies show that Guaruba and Diopsittaca (red-shouldered macaw) are sister genera. It is also closely related to Leptosittaca branicki, (golden-plumed parakeet).

== Description ==
The golden parakeet is 34–36 cm (13–14 in) long and mainly yellow with green in the outer wings and with an all-yellow tail. It has a large horn-colored (gray) beak, pale-pink bare eye rings, brown irises, and pink legs. Males and females have identical external appearance. Juveniles are duller and have less yellow and more green plumage than the adults. The juvenile's head and neck are mostly green, the back is green and yellow, the upper side of tail is mostly green, the breast is greenish, the eye rings are pale-gray, and the legs are brown.

== Distribution and habitat ==
Its range is estimated to be limited to about 174,000 km^{2}. between the Tocantins, lower Xingu, and Tapajós Rivers in the Amazon Basin south of the Amazon River in the state of Pará, northern Brazil. Additional records occur from adjacent northern Maranhão. The birds in a 1986 study used two different habitats during the year; during the nonbreeding season, which coincided with the dry season, they occupied the tall forest. During the breeding season, they left the tall forest and entered open areas on the edge of the forest such as fields used in agriculture.

== Behavior and ecology ==
Golden parakeets are a social species, living, feeding, sleeping, and even breeding together. In the wild, they have a varied diet, feeding on fruits such as mango, muruci and açai, flowers, buds, seeds (including Croton matouensis, and crop plants, particularly maize.

=== Breeding ===
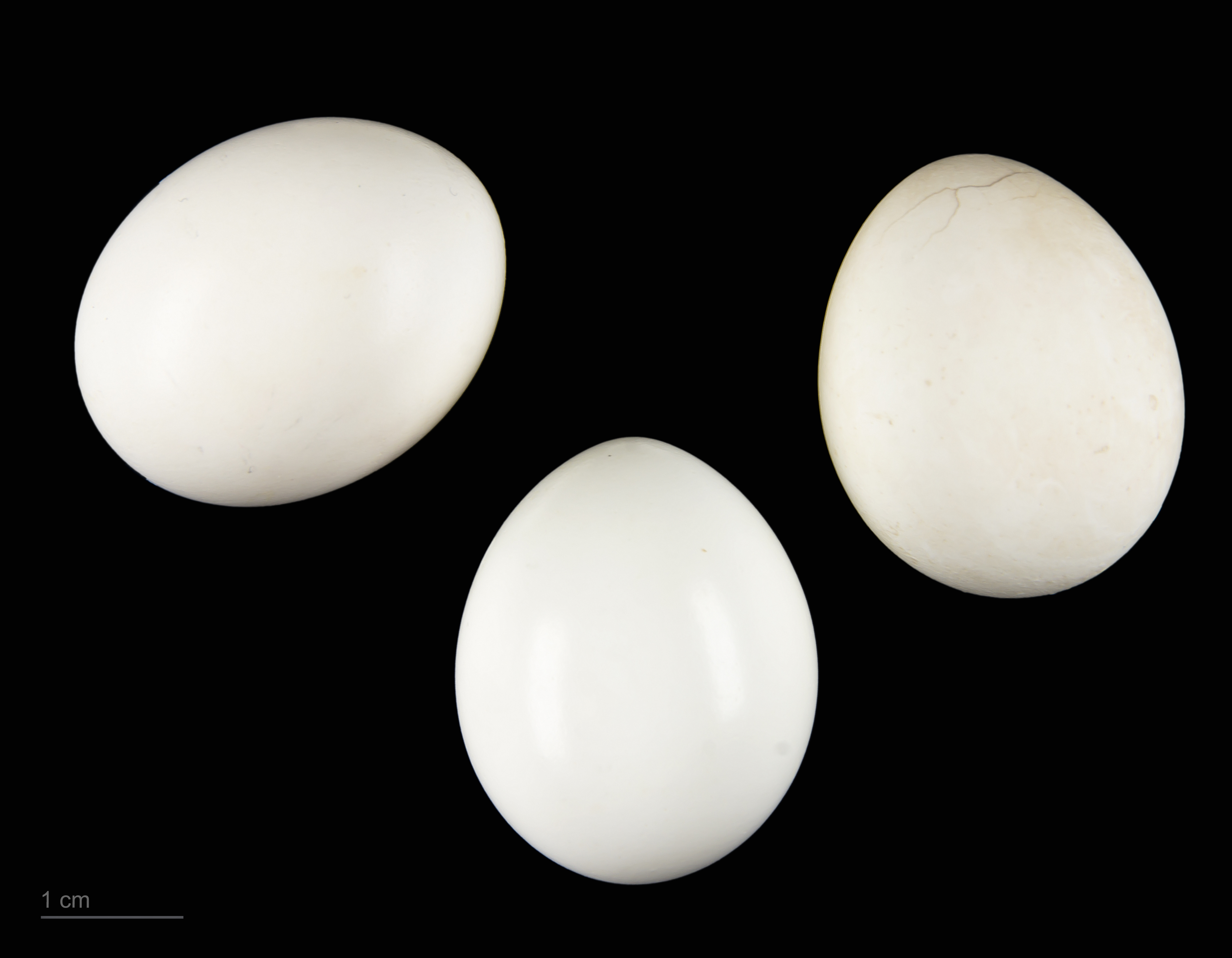
Guaruba guarouba - MHNT

The golden parakeet's breeding system is almost unique amongst parrots, as pairs are aided by a number of helpers which aid in the raising of the young. This behavior is less common with parakeets in captivity, which often abandon their young after three weeks.

After the golden parakeet reaches sexual maturity at the age of three years, the breeding season starts in November and runs through February. They nest in a high tree, in deeper than average nesting cavities, and lay an average of four 37.1 by 29.9 mm (1.46 by 1.18 in) white eggs, which they aggressively guard. The incubation period is about 30 days, in which the male and female take turns incubating. In the first few years of sexual maturity, golden parakeets tend to lay infertile clutches until the age of six to eight. In captivity, golden parakeets resume breeding when their chicks are taken from them.

At birth, golden parakeets are covered in white down that eventually turns darker within a week. By the end of the third week, wing feathers start to develop. Juveniles are playful, but may turn abusive against their peers. Nestlings are preyed upon by toucans, which may explain their social behavior. Nests are vigorously defended from toucans by several members of the group.

== Conservation and threats ==
The golden parakeet is listed on the IUCN Red List as vulnerable. This is largely due to deforestation and the capture of wild birds for aviculture, where it is in high demand due to the attractiveness of its plumage. Locally, they are considered as pests for feeding on crops, and are hunted for food or sport. The current population is estimated to be in the range of 10,000 to 20,000.

An example of the displacement of golden parakeets by habitat loss comes from the building of the Tucuruí Dam, Pará, from 1975 to 1984. More than 35,000 forest dwellers were forced from what had been a habitat that was considered to be "among the richest and most diversified in the world." In addition, 2,875 km^{2} (1,110 sq mi) of rainforest were flooded, and 1,600 islands were produced by the flooding, all of which were heavily deforested.

An international effort led by the Brazilian government in partnership with Parrots International, Lymington Foundation, the University of São Paulo and others is underway to raise young birds in captivity reintegrate them to their natural habitat with support of locals in Northeast Brazil.

== Gallery ==
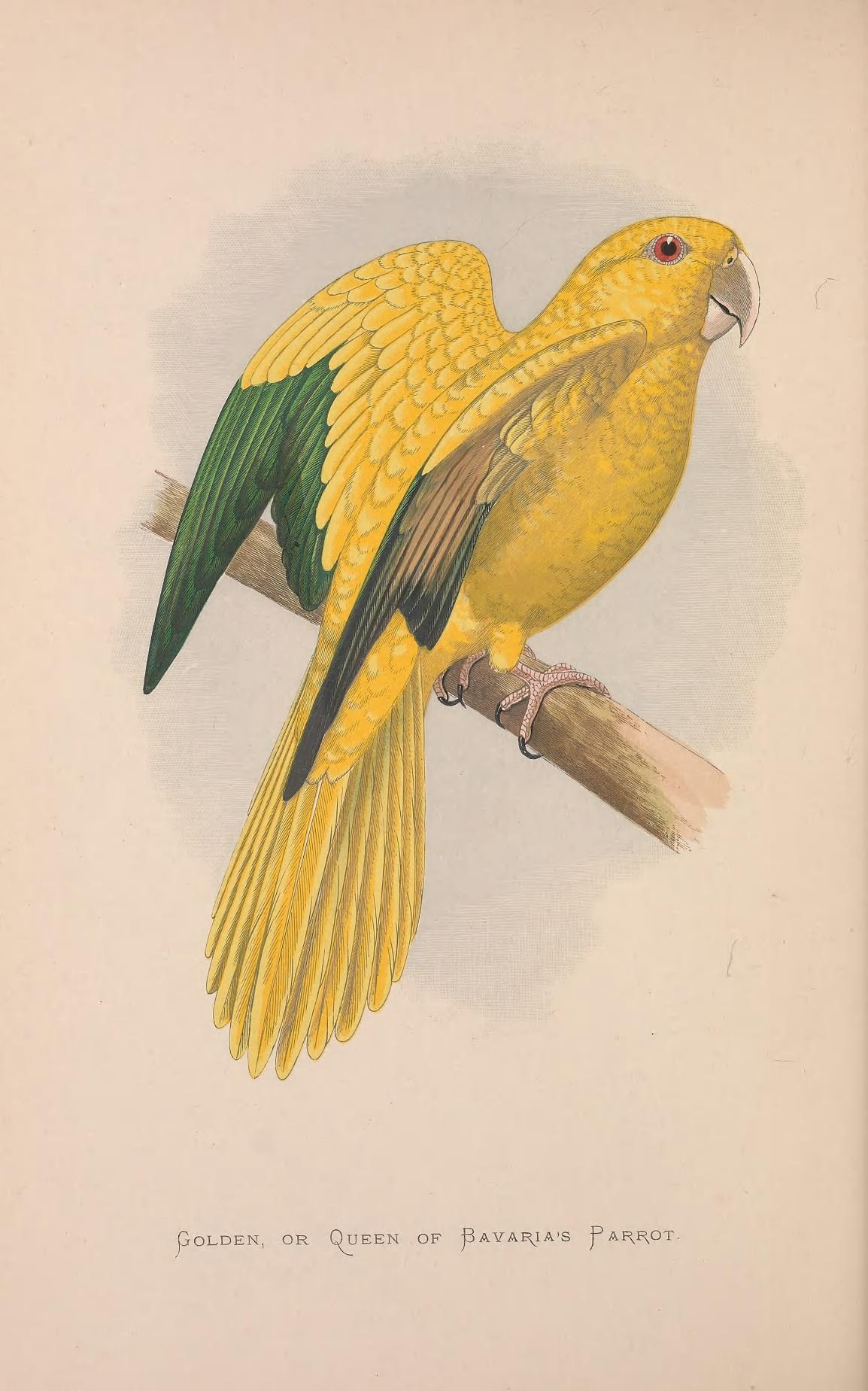
Queen of Bavaria's Parrot

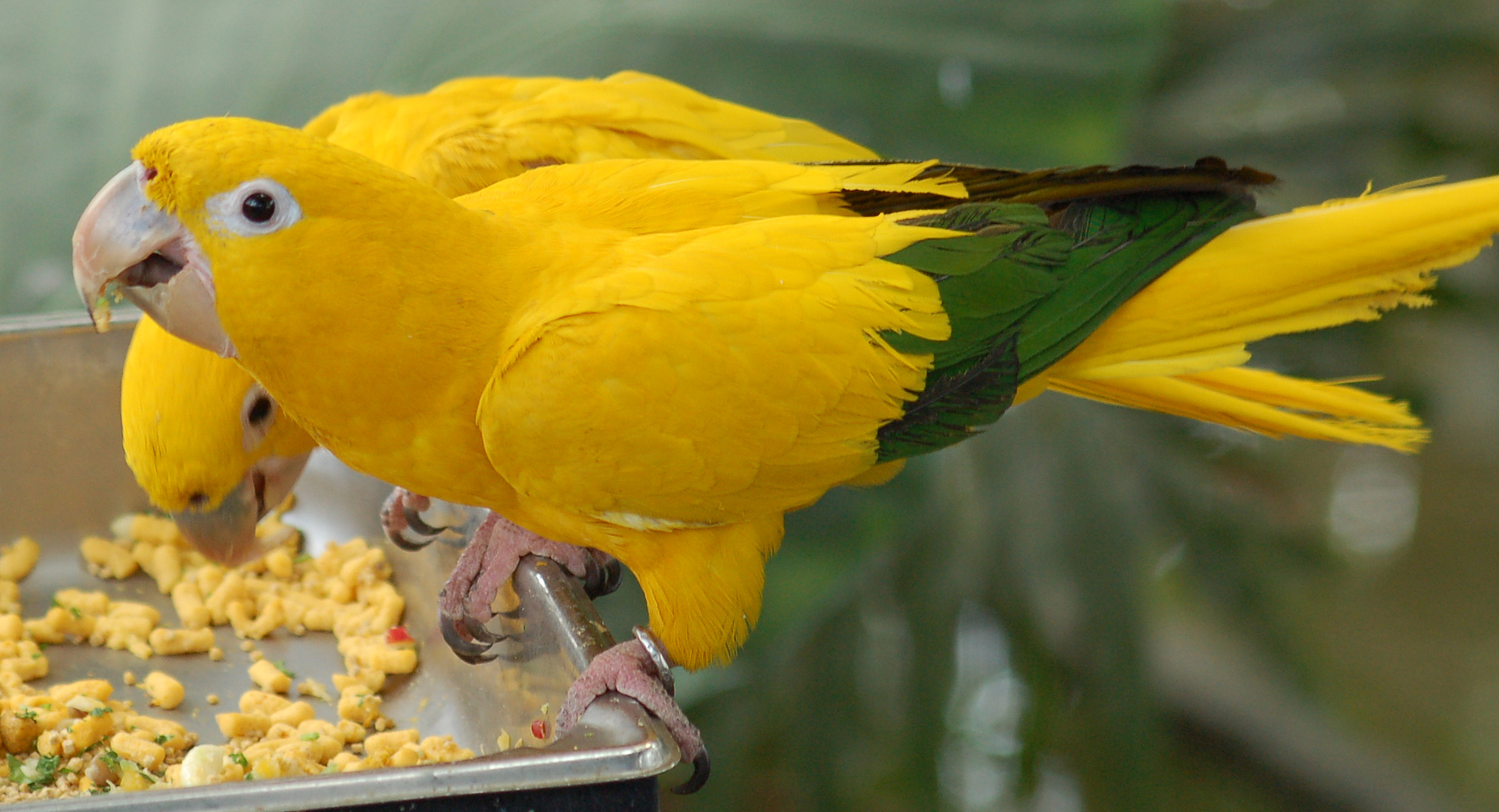
Feeding in captivity at the National Aviary

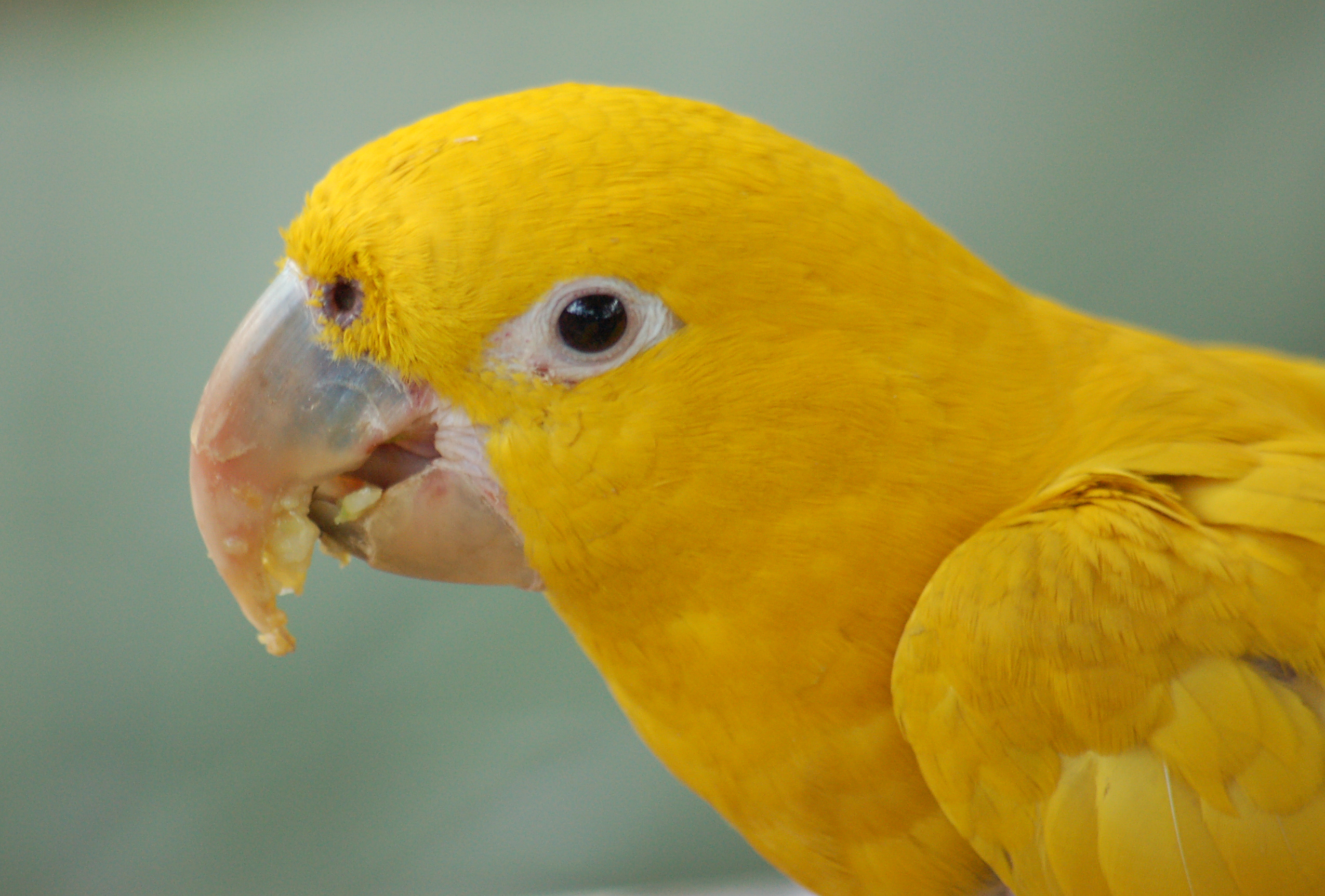
Closeup of the head

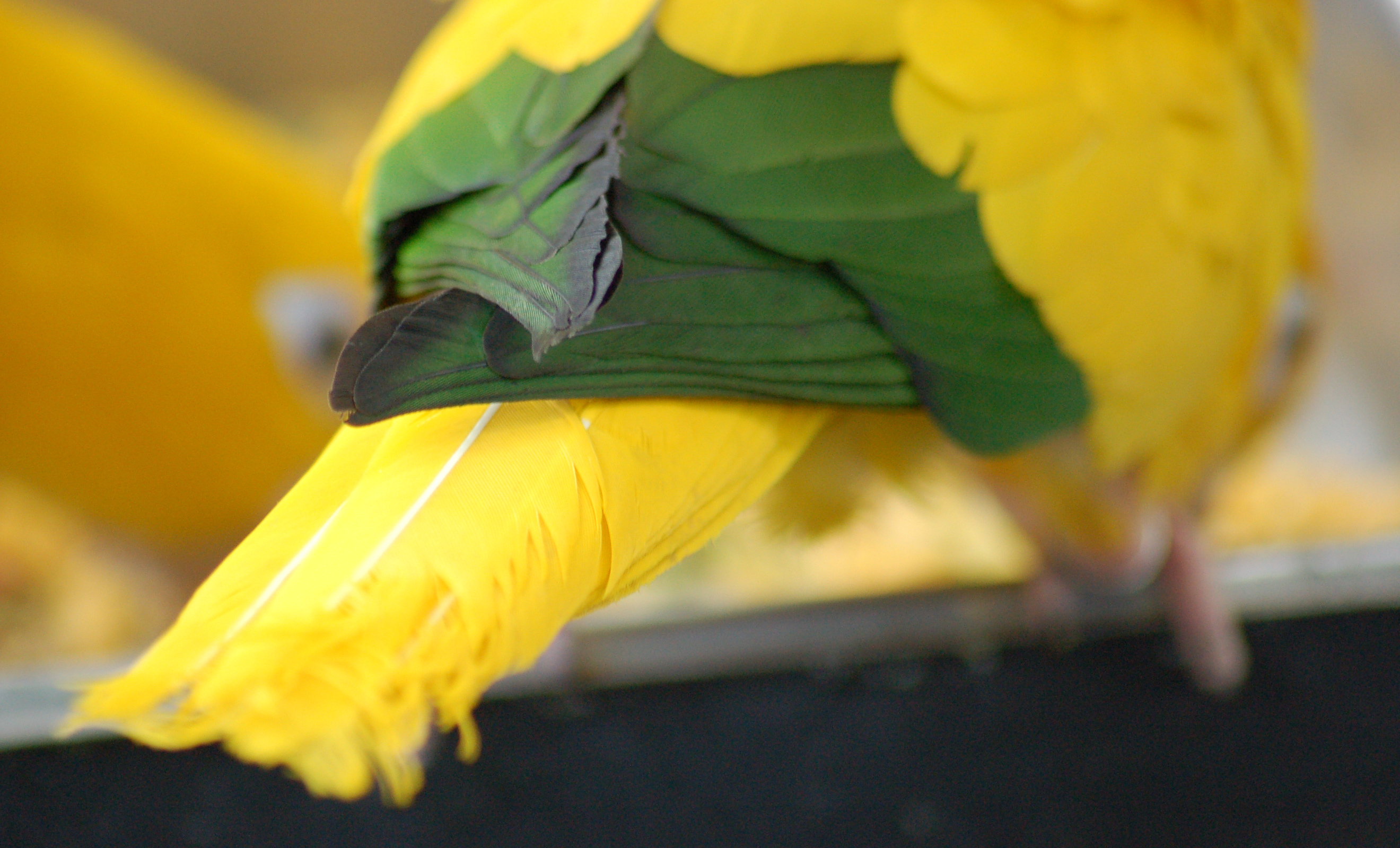
Closeup of the tail

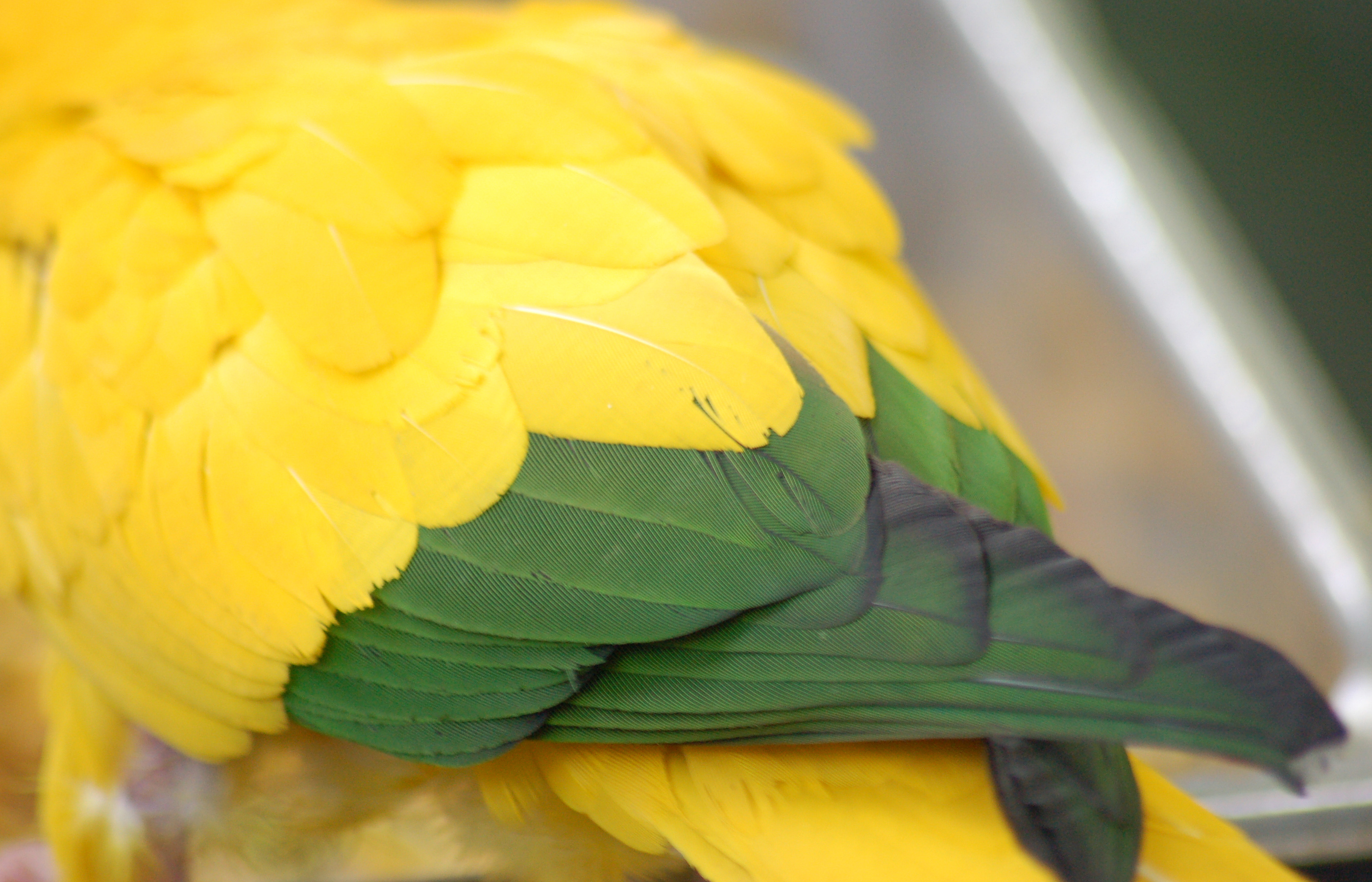
Closeup of green outer wing

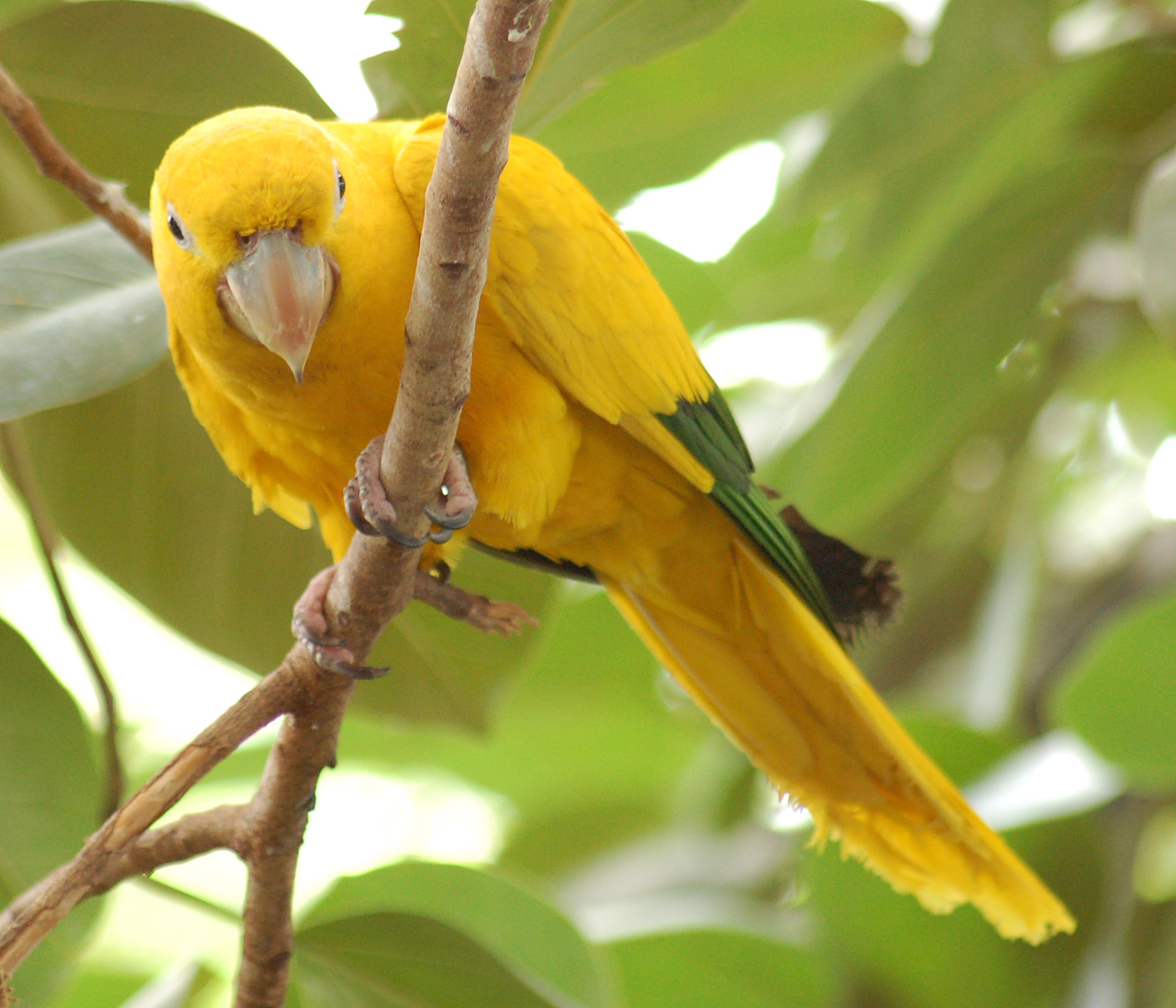
At the National Aviary

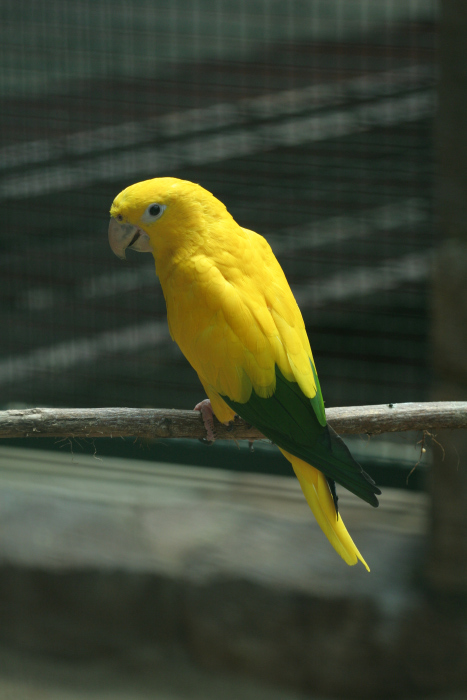
At Walsrode Bird Park

== See also ==
- Conure
- Sun parakeet
