= Madeira parakeet =

Conservation status
- Least Concern (IUCN 3.1)

Scientific classification
- Kingdom: Animalia
- Phylum: Chordata
- Class: Aves
- Order: Psittaciformes
- Family: Psittacidae
- Genus: Pyrrhura
- Species: P. snethlageae

Binomial name
- Pyrrhura snethlageae Joseph & Bates, 2002
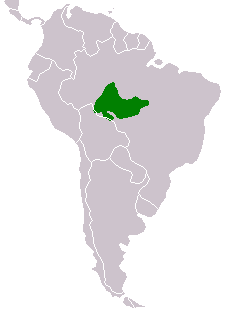

South American bird species

The Madeira parakeet (Pyrrhura snethlageae), also known as the Madeira conure, is a species of parrot found in Brazil and Bolivia. It is found in the eastern and central Amazon basin south of the Amazon River and can be found in várzea forests. It prefers habitats with bamboo along waterways, it also enjoys clearings in dense forests. It was named after Emilie Snethlage.

== Description ==
Madeira parakeets have white coverts on their ears. They have a cream upper breast with brown feather shafts. Their lower breast has yellow with green feather shafts. Their bill is brown and grey and they also have a yellow eye ring. The plumage of a juvenile is unknown.

== Status ==
The species is classified as Least Concern because it has a large area in which it inhabits. Until 2021, the species was classified as Vulnerable because of its low population. The population of the Madeira parakeet is slowly decreasing at a steady rate. Its habitat is at risk because the land is commonly used as housing and farmland.
