= Paulie (film) =

American comedy film

- Theatrical release poster
- Directed by: John Roberts
- Written by: Laurie Craig
- Produced by: Mark Gordon; Gary Levinsohn; Allison Lyon Segan
- Starring: Gena Rowlands; Tony Shalhoub; Cheech Marin; Bruce Davison; Jay Mohr
- Cinematography: Tony Pierce-Roberts
- Edited by: Bruce Cannon
- Music by: John Debney
- Production companies: DreamWorks Pictures; Mutual Film Company
- Distributed by: DreamWorks Distribution
- Release date: April 17, 1998
- Running time: 91 minutes
- Country: United States
- Language: English
- Budget: $23 million
- Box office: $26.9 million

Paulie is a 1998 American adventure comedy-drama film directed by John Roberts and written by Laurie Craig. The film follows the adventurous story of a disobedient bird named Paulie, a talking parrot who is capable of communicating with humans. It stars Jay Mohr as the voice of the title character, alongside Gena Rowlands, Tony Shalhoub, Cheech Marin, and Bruce Davison. Paulie was the first collaboration between Rowlands and Bill Cobbs (the second being Hope Floats in 1998).

The film was released by DreamWorks Pictures on April 17, 1998. It received mixed-to-positive reviews and was a box office disappointment, grossing $26.9 million domestically against a $23 million budget. However, in the years after its release, Paulie would find a larger audience on home media sales.

== Plot ==
While working as a janitor at an American institute, Russian immigrant Misha Vilyenkov encounters Paulie, a wisecracking and loudmouthed blue-crowned conure who can speak as clearly as a human. Subsequently, he doesn't speak a word when Misha brings Dr. Reingold, the head of the institute, and other scientists to witness him.

Frustrated with Paulie at first, Misha relents and opens up about his homesickness. Paulie warms up to Misha, and he tells him his story about his original owner, a little girl named Marie Alweather who stutters. The story transitions to a flashback when he was gifted to her in his infancy. As Marie works on speech therapy, he begins to speak. Her father, Warren, a soldier, returns home from Vietnam and decides that Paulie is not helping her, believing their bond is disillusioning Marie's reality due to her claims of his ability to talk; Paulie never spoke to her parents out of fear towards them, and also refused to learn how to fly due to acrophobia. After a near-death experience in which she falls off the roof in an attempt to teach Paulie to fly, Warren sends him away, devastating Marie.

Paulie is passed down to various owners and eventually ends up in a pawn shop where he spends his time badmouthing the customers. One day, a shady customer named Benny shows interest in purchasing him, thinking he could profit from his speaking abilities, until widowed artist Ivy purchases him first with the intent of reforming his ill behavior after he insults her. She befriends Paulie and agrees to help him find Marie, who has moved to Los Angeles. They begin traveling using her mobile home, but when she becomes blind in the middle of their trip, Paulie decides to stay and take care of her. She eventually passes away, and Paulie, having finally learned to fly, continues his journey.

In East Los Angeles, Paulie joins a group of performing conures owned by migrant musician Ignacio, temporarily forgetting about Marie as he develops feelings for a female named Lupe. At one of his performances, Benny, having also moved to Los Angeles, recognizes him and attempts to purchase him from Ignacio. When Ignacio refuses, Benny makes a prank call to the police at one of his performances. As the police show up, Benny kidnaps Paulie amidst the chaos as Ignacio is arrested and presumably deported. Under Benny's influence, who convinces him that gaining enough money could hire a detective to find Marie, Paulie begins a life of crime. In a botched jewel theft, he flies down through the chimney of a house, where he gets caught by the grandson of its owner, while Benny is forced to flee the scene, abandoning Paulie in the process.

Paulie is then brought to the institute, where Reingold, his employees and fellow scientists are stunned by his ability to speak to humans. They subject him to speech testing, and Reingold promises that he will be reunited with Marie once finished. Paulie overhears Reingold privately revealing that he and the institute have found Marie's whereabouts, but concealed this information from him so that he would remain their property. Realizing he's been lied to all this time, a resentful Paulie humiliates Reingold in front of his scientific peers by acting like an ordinary parrot, disrespecting him and his assistants while refusing to cooperate with more tests. He then calls out Reingold's deception, and tries to make a break for it. As a result, his wings are clipped and he is eventually imprisoned in the basement when he starts pecking the researchers.

Moved by Paulie's story, Misha decides to release him and take him to Marie. They find Marie's contact information in Reingold's office, only to be caught by him. Misha stands up to Reingold for his cruelty to Paulie and gladly resigns. They narrowly escape the institute, just after releasing the other caged animals in the testing lab. The duo reach Marie's address, and find her as a beautiful young woman unrecognizable to Paulie. After singing a song her mother sang to her as a child, Paulie realizes that she is Marie and they happily reunite. He also realizes he can fly again as his feathers have regrown. Misha prepares to depart, but Paulie and Marie offer him to stay. Misha, evidently infatuated with Marie, decides to accept. The film ends with the trio happily entering her house.

== Cast ==
- Jay Mohr as:
  - voice of Paulie, a blue-crowned parakeet
  - Benny, a small-time thief
- Gena Rowlands as Ivy, a widowed artist
- Tony Shalhoub as Mikael Androvich "Misha" Vilyenkov, a recent US immigrant from Russia
- Cheech Marin as Ignacio, a musician
- Bruce Davison as Dr. Reingold, a biological research scientist
- Trini Alvarado as Marie Alweather, Paulie's owner and Misha's love interest
  - Hallie Kate Eisenberg as Young Marie, a young girl who stutters from 1978
- Buddy Hackett as Artie, owner of a pawn shop
- Matt Craven as Warren Alweather, Marie's father from 1978
- Bill Cobbs as Virgil, a janitor at the institute
- Tia Texada as:
  - Ruby, Benny's girlfriend
  - voice of Lupe, a jandaya parakeet
- Laura Harrington as Lila Alweather, Marie's mother from 1978
- Hal Robinson as Marie's grandfather from 1978
- Jerry Winsett as Mr. Tauper

== Production ==
Paulie was one of the initial live-action scripts the new DreamWorks Pictures studio had in development, along with The Peacemaker, Amistad and Mouse Hunt, which were all released in late 1997. Paulie's eventual April 1998 release still predated the launch of the studio's animation division DreamWorks Animation, which started releasing films later in 1998, with Antz and The Prince of Egypt.

Filming for Paulie took place between July 1997 and October 1997 in California and Toronto, Canada. The film's production budget was $23 million.

Screenwriter Laurie Craig mentioned in an interview, "Paulie was an original story of mine. I was inspired by seeing a lone parrot in a cage and I wondered what it would be like if he could actually tell me his life story. Then I read about the amazing African Grey parrot named Alex who had a large vocabulary and was very bonded with his researcher."

During the production of the film, 14 trained blue-crowned conures were used to portray the titular character, with other conure species such as nanday, jenday and cherry-headed conures appearing in supporting roles.

Exterior shots of young Marie's house were filmed in Azusa, California, on the corner of N. Soldano Ave. and Sixth St. Unfortunately, the house was demolished a couple of years after production, and the lot was split up for smaller homes. The production team mailed thank you letters to the residents along the street for the inconvenience.

== Music ==
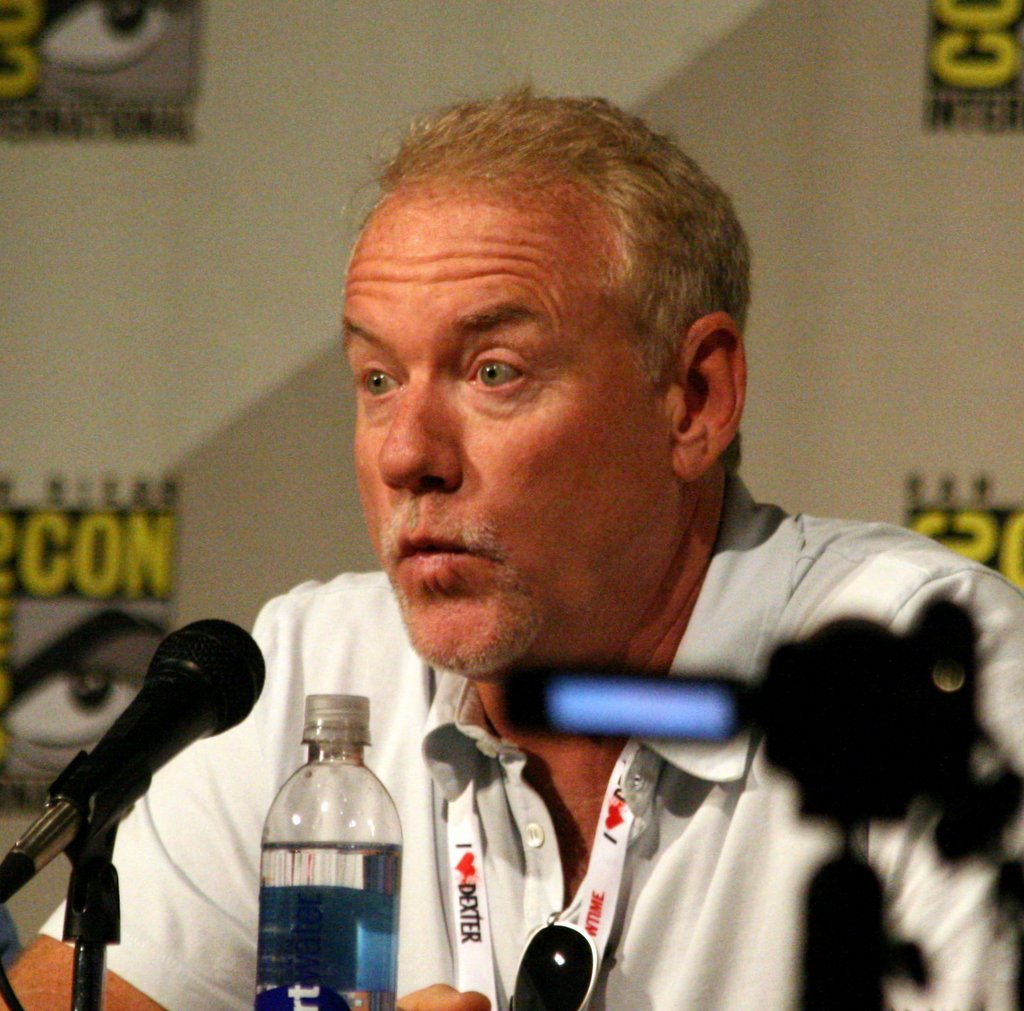
John Debney composed the film's score.

John Debney's background score for Paulie was released on May 19, 1998. The album was handled by soundtrack specialty label Varèse Sarabande, rather than by DreamWorks' own record label DreamWorks Records, which primarily focused on releasing albums by rock and pop artists.

== Release and reception ==
=== Promotion ===
In November 1997, DreamWorks partnered with FreeZone, a youth-focused online platform, to create interactive websites for three of its upcoming films: Mouse Hunt, Paulie, and Small Soldiers. Mouse Hunt completed shooting in July 1997 and would be released in December 1997, while Small Soldiers began shooting in November 1997 and wasn't released until July 1998. The collaboration was intended to serve as an online promotional campaign, with each film receiving its own dedicated site featuring games, film clips, and contests. The website for Mouse Hunt was the first of the three to launch. Neither Paulie nor Mouse Hunt would have any video game tie-in by DreamWorks Interactive, which ended up mainly releasing non-DreamWorks related video games. However, DreamWorks Interactive did make two separate PC and PlayStation video game tie-ins for Small Soldiers.

=== Box office ===
The film grossed $5,369,800 on its opening weekend, and $26,875,268 total. It was released in 1,812 North American theaters.

=== Critical response ===
The film scored a 62% approval rating at Rotten Tomatoes from 37 reviews, with an average rating of 6.2/10. It was distributed in 24 countries and 10 different languages between 1998 and 1999.

Roger Ebert of the Chicago Times gave the film two stars out of four and said, "Dogs and cats, horses and monkeys and even bears make charismatic movie stars, but Paulie, I think, suggests that birds are more decorative than dramatic." Tracey Moore of Common Sense Media gave the film a four stars out of five and said, "Talking bird on a coming-of-age journey with some peril."

=== Awards and nominations ===
| Award | Category | Result | Ref. |
|---|---|---|---|
| ALMA Award | Outstanding Actor in a Feature Film - Cheech Marin | Nominated | |
| ALMA Award | Outstanding Actress in a Feature Film - Trini Alvarado | Nominated | |
| British Academy Children's Awards | Best Children's Feature Film | Won | |
| Bronze Gryphon | Early Screens - John Roberts | Won | |
| Young Artist Award | Best family feature - Comedy | Nominated | |
| Young Artist Award | Best performance in a feature film - Young Actress aged ten or under - Hallie Kate Eisenberg | Nominated | |

== Home media ==
The film was released on VHS by DreamWorks Home Entertainment on September 29, 1998, and then on DVD on April 20, 1999. On August 3, 1999, it received a U.S. LaserDisc release by DreamWorks Home Entertainment. The film's 1999 DVD was briefly shown during a scene in the 2006 DreamWorks Animation film Flushed Away. The scene depicted several DreamWorks Animation DVDs, alongside Paulie and other live-action DreamWorks DVDs including Just like Heaven, Mouse Hunt, Old School, Red Eye, The Last Castle, The Love Letter and The Peacemaker.

n February 2006, Viacom (now known as Paramount Skydance) acquired the rights to Paulie and all 58 other live-action films DreamWorks had released since 1997, following their billion-dollar acquisition of the studio's live-action film library and the library of DreamWorks Television. As part of the deal, Viacom/Paramount also signed a six-year distribution agreement with DreamWorks Animation, which spun off into its own separate company in October 2004.

On December 11, 2007, a 2-disc double feature DVD was released, which included Paulie and the 1997 DreamWorks film Mouse Hunt. A 2008 Australian Region 4 version of this release also exists, along with a 2007 Danish Region 2 version. This double feature was still branded as a DreamWorks Home Entertainment release rather than a Paramount Home Entertainment release, as between 2006 and 2008, DreamWorks' live-action division served as a sublabel of Paramount Pictures, which was still actively releasing new movies. DreamWorks' live-action division eventually became an independent studio again in September 2008, although Paramount retained ownership of all live-action films DreamWorks had released up to that point. On October 6, 2008, Paramount Home Entertainment released a DVD which bundled Paulie together with two of their other films; the 1994 version of Lassie and the 2006 version of Charlotte's Web. In 2013, Paramount Home Entertainment released an Australian Region 4 DVD which bundled Paulie together with four other films; Mouse Hunt, The Indian in the Cupboard (a Paramount Pictures film), Imagine That (another Paramount Pictures film) and Lemony Snicket's A Series of Unfortunate Events (a film co-released by DreamWorks and Paramount in 2004). Paramount later added Paulie to their streaming service Paramount+.
