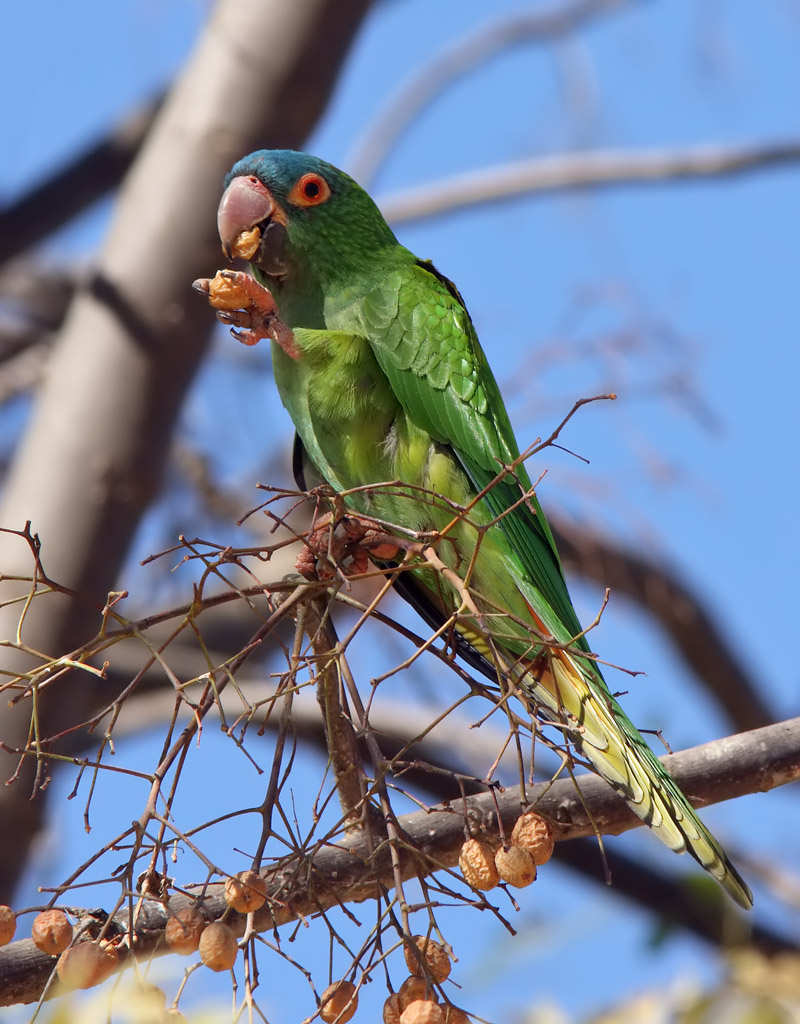
- Thectocercus acuticaudatus neumanni in San Isidro in Bolivia

Conservation status
- Least Concern (IUCN 3.1)

Scientific classification
- Kingdom: Animalia
- Phylum: Chordata
- Class: Aves
- Order: Psittaciformes
- Family: Psittacidae
- Tribe: Arini
- Genus: Thectocercus; Ridgway, 1912
- Species: T. acuticaudatus

Binomial name
- Thectocercus acuticaudatus (Vieillot, 1818)

Synonyms
- Aratinga acuticaudata Psittacara acuticaudatus

= Blue-crowned parakeet =

Species of bird

The blue-crowned parakeet, blue-crowned conure, or sharp-tailed conure (Thectocercus acuticaudatus) is a small green Neotropical parrot with a blue head and pale beak native to large parts of South America, from eastern Colombia to Curacao in the southern Caribbean, and to the northern region of Argentina. They inhabit savanna-like habitats, woodland and forest margins, but avoid dense humid forest such as the Amazon.

This species is officially called a parakeet by the AOU and by birders, though usually called conures in aviculture.

== Taxonomy ==
While T. acuticaudatus is the only species in the monotypic genus Thectocercus, this species has five subspecies:

- Thectocercus acuticaudatus (Vieillot 1818)
  - Thectocercus acuticaudatus acuticaudatus (Vieillot 1818)
  - Thectocercus acuticaudatus haemorrhous (Spix 1824)
  - Thectocercus acuticaudatus koenigi (Arndt 1995)
  - Thectocercus acuticaudatus neoxenus (Cory 1909)
  - Thectocercus acuticaudatus neumanni (Blake and Traylor 1947)

Previously, this species was part of the genus Aratinga, but that genus was split in four distinct genera once various phylogenetic studies showed that the genus, as traditionally defined, was polyphyletic.

== Description ==
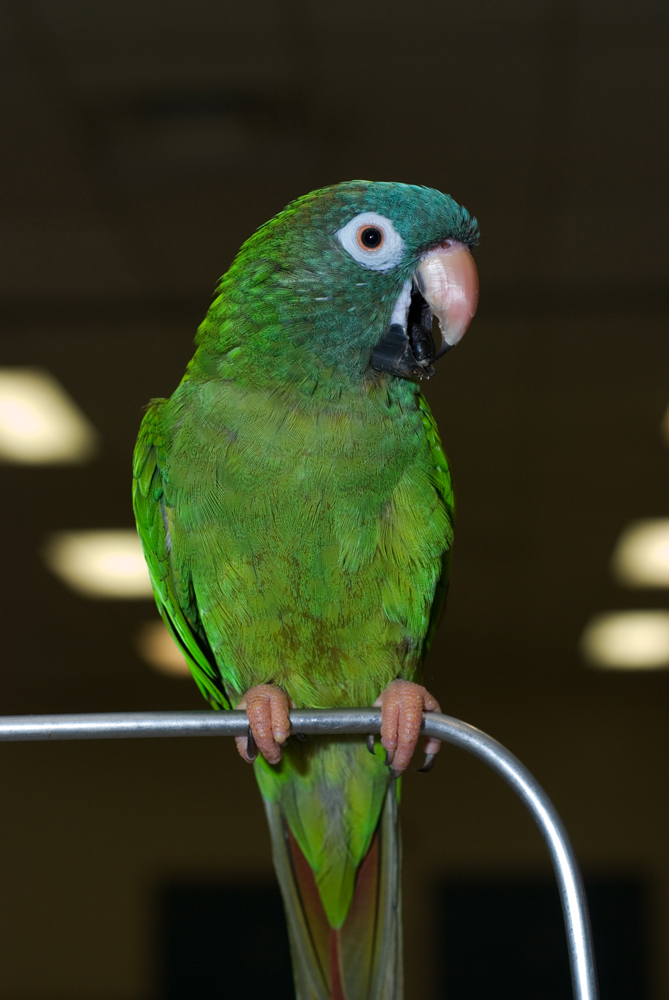
Pet

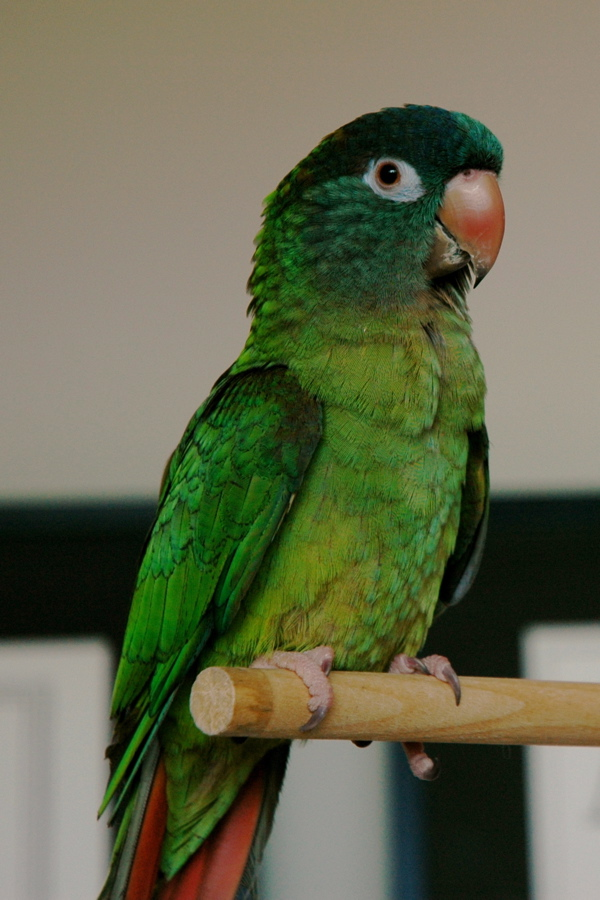
Pet

The blue-crowned parakeet is a medium-sized bird measuring approximately 37 cm (14.5 in) in length and weighing between 140 and 190 g (4.9 and 6.7 oz).

Blue-crowns are born with red coloring around the head, but blue-crowns are predominantly green, with dull blue coloring on the forehead, crown, cheeks, and ears in the nominate, but less blue in other subspecies. It has a ring of white featherless skin around each eye, though this is bright orange-yellow in wild T. acuticaudata neumanni. The breast feathers may also be tinged with blue, though they are more commonly green to yellow-green. Closed wing coloring matches that of the body while extended wings show blue-brown, becoming chestnut on the outer flight feathers. The tail feathers are green on top, maroon to red-brown on the underside, iridescing to bright orange and scarlet under full-spectrum light. Legs are pink-brown with grey-brown claws. The upper mandible is horn-colored, tapering to a needle-sharp, grey-black tip. In the southern and western nominate and subspecies neumanni, the lower mandible is horn-colored in juveniles, fading to grey-black by the bird's second year. The remaining eastern, central and northern subspecies retain the horn-colored lower mandible throughout adulthood.

== Breeding ==
The blue-crowned parakeet's nest is a hole in a tree. The eggs are white and there are usually three to four in a clutch. The female incubates the eggs for 26 days, and the chicks fledge from the nest about 52 days after hatching.

== Aviculture ==
Blue-crowned parakeets are generally called blue-crowned conures in aviculture. They are social birds and are relatively good talkers compared to other conures. They have become quite popular as pets, with a reputation as one of the "easier" parrots to care for. However, they are also intelligent, high-energy birds that require a lot of attention and a cage with ample room and toys. They can also be quite loud at times. Consequently, they are more appropriate companions for serious bird enthusiasts rather than the casual birdkeeper.

== In fiction ==
- A talking blue-crowned conure was the titular star of the family movie Paulie. In the film, Paulie, the main character was played by 14 different birds.
