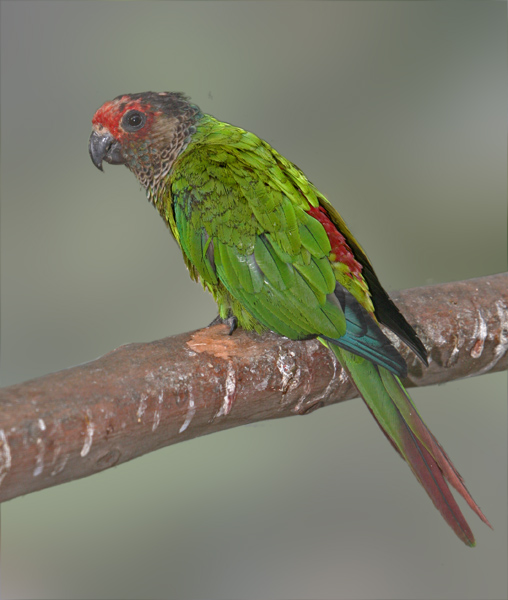
- Pyrrhura r. roseifrons

Conservation status
- Least Concern (IUCN 3.1)(but see the Status section)
- CITES Appendix II (CITES)

Scientific classification
- Kingdom: Animalia
- Phylum: Chordata
- Class: Aves
- Order: Psittaciformes
- Family: Psittacidae
- Genus: Pyrrhura
- Species: P. roseifrons

Binomial name
- Pyrrhura roseifrons (Gray, 1859)
- Range of P. r. roseifrons

Synonyms
- Pyrrhura picta roseifrons Pyrrhura picta peruviana Pyrrhura peruviana

= Rose-fronted parakeet =

Species of bird

The rose-fronted parakeet (Pyrrhura roseifrons), known as the rose-fronted conure in aviculture, is a species of bird in the subfamily Arinae of the family Psittacidae, the African and New World parrots. It is found in Bolivia, Brazil, Ecuador, and Peru.

== Taxonomy and systematics ==
The taxonomy of the rose-fronted parakeet is unsettled. Until the early 2000s, it was considered a subspecies of the painted parakeet (P. picta). They were separated, and subspecies added to it, as a result of studies published in 2002 and 2006. More subspecies were added as a result of a 2008 publication.

The International Ornithological Committee (IOC), the South American Classification Committee of the American Ornithological Society, and the Clements taxonomy assign it these four subspecies:

- P. r. peruviana Hocking, Blake & Joseph, 2002
- P. r. dilutissima Arndt, 2008
- P. r. parvifrons Arndt, 2008
- P. r. roseifrons (Gray, 1859)

The 2008 paper advocated that roseifrons and parvifrons be treated as monotypic species. It further advocated that peruviana be treated as a species with dilutissima as a subspecies of it. BirdLife International's Handbook of the Birds of the World adopted this three-species treatment, naming them rose-fronted, Garlepp's, and wavy-breasted parakeets respectively.

The rose-fronted parakeet is sometimes called the red-crowned parakeet, potentially leading to confusion with the New Zealand species of that name, Cyanoramphus novaezelandiae.

This article follows the four-subspecies model.

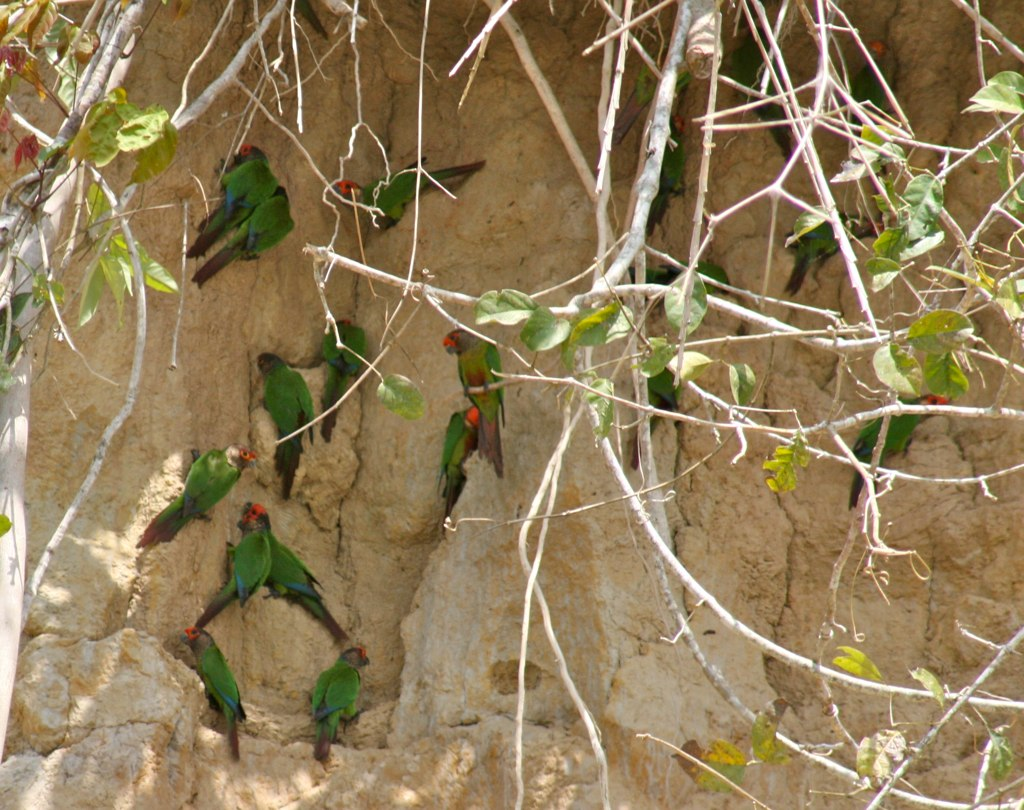
At a clay lick

== Description ==
The rose-fronted parakeet is 20 to 23 cm (7.9 to 9.1 in) long. The sexes are the same in all subspecies. Adults of the nominate subspecies P. r. roseifrons have a bright red crown and face and dirty whitish ear coverts. Their upperparts are mostly green with a maroon-red red lower back and rump. The hindcrown, throat, and breast are dark with buff to buffy-white edges to the feathers. The center of their belly is deep red to brownish red, and the rest of their underparts are yellowish green. Their wing is mostly green with blue primaries. Their tail is maroon. The iris is orange-brown to dark brown with pale pinkish white to blackish bare skin around it. Their bill is blackish with a whitish cere and their legs and feet are blackish gray. Immatures are similar to adults but without the red crown and face.

Subspecies P. r. peruviana has a deep maroon forehead, a greenish blue forecrown, a dusky gray hindcrown and nape, and a thin light blue band on the upper hindneck. Its face is mostly deep rusty brown to deep maroon with some greenish blue below the eye. Its throat and breast feathers are grayish with blackish wedge shapes and yellowish fringes. Its tail has a green base. P. r. dilutissima is similar to peruviana but has less blue on the forecrown, a rusty red rather than maroon face, and a grayer throat and breast with more yellow. P. r. parvifrons resembles the nominate but has a narrow red lower forehead, a dark brown crown and nape, and a deep red-brown face.

== Distribution and habitat ==
The subspecies of the rose-fronted parakeet are found thus:

- P. r. peruviana, Morona-Santiago Province in southeastern Ecuador and Amazonas and Loreto provinces in northeastern Peru
- P. r. dilutissima, the Apurímac River valley in central Peru
- P. r. parvifrons, Peru: eastern San Martín and west central Loreto departments and disjunctly in northeastern Loreto, the latter possibly only south of the Amazon River
- P. r. roseifrons, south of the Amazon from northern Peru south to northern Bolivia and east into Brazil's Amazonas state (Note that the range map is of only this subspecies.)

The rose-fronted parakeet inhabits lowland evergreen forests and nearby clearings. The one confirmed record in Ecuador was at 875 m (2,900 ft). In Peru, it occurs as high as 1,650 m (5,400 ft).

== Behavior ==
=== Movement ===
Nothing is known about the rose-fronted parakeet's movements.

=== Feeding ===
The rose-fronted parakeet has been observed foraging in flocks of up to about 30 individuals. Its diet includes fruit, seeds, flowers, and leaves of both wild and cultivated plants and trees.

=== Breeding ===
The rose-fronted parakeet breeds between January and March in northeastern Peru. An active nest was found in southeastern Peru's Manú National Park in early October. The nest was in a cavity in a live tree about 9 m (30 ft) above the ground. It held three eggs and a newly hatched chick. Four adults were tending the clutch.

=== Vocalization ===
The rose-fronted parakeet's flight call is "rolling bursts of prrrt prrrt notes" and it also makes "screeching calls and other conversational notes".

== Status ==
The IUCN follows HBW taxonomy and so has separately assessed the subspecies of the rose-fronted parakeet. It has rated the nominate (P. r. roseifrons), "Garlepp's" parakeet (P. r. parvifrons), and "wavy-breasted" parakeet (P. r. peruviana + P. r. dilutissima) as being of Least Concern. None of them have a known population size and all populations are believed to be decreasing. No immediate threats have been identified for any of them. The species is known from a few protected areas. Some habitat is being lost to deforestation but the species does not appear to be much affected by the pet trade.
