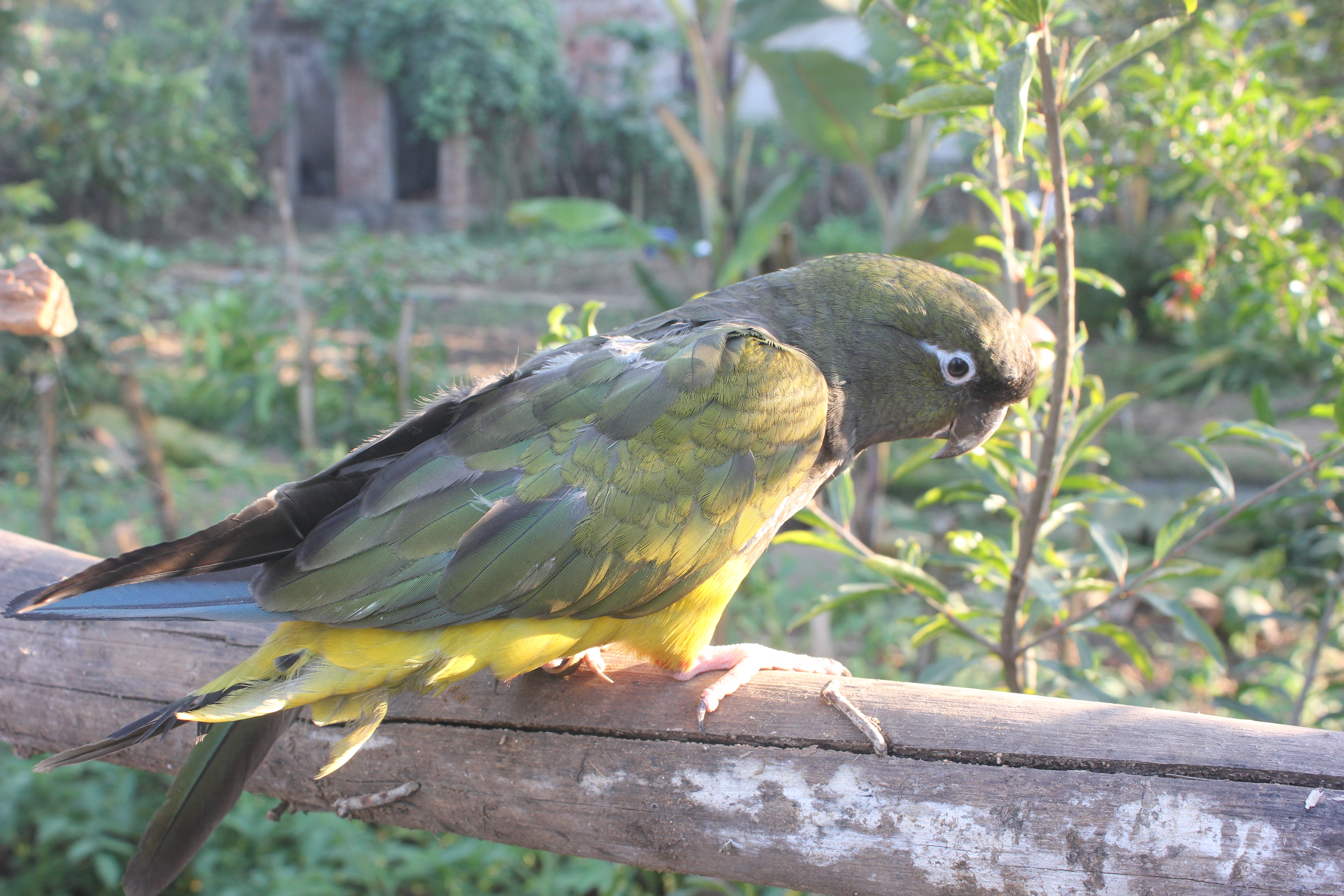
- Burrowing parrot (Cyanoliseus patagonus)

Scientific classification
- Domain: Eukaryota
- Kingdom: Animalia
- Phylum: Chordata
- Class: Aves
- Order: Psittaciformes
- Family: Psittacidae
- Tribe: Arini
- Genus: Cyanoliseus; Bonaparte, 1854

Species
- Cyanoliseus patagonus; †Cyanoliseus ensenadensis; †Cyanoliseus patagonopsis

= Cyanoliseus =

Genus of birds

Cyanoliseus is a genus of parrot that contains a single living species, the burrowing parrot (Cyanoliseus patagonus).

Two fossil species are known from the Pleistocene: Cyanoliseus patagonopsis and Cyanoliseus ensenadensis, which was formerly placed in Pionus. Both fossils have been found in Argentina and are among the few extinct prehistoric representatives of extant parrot genera.
