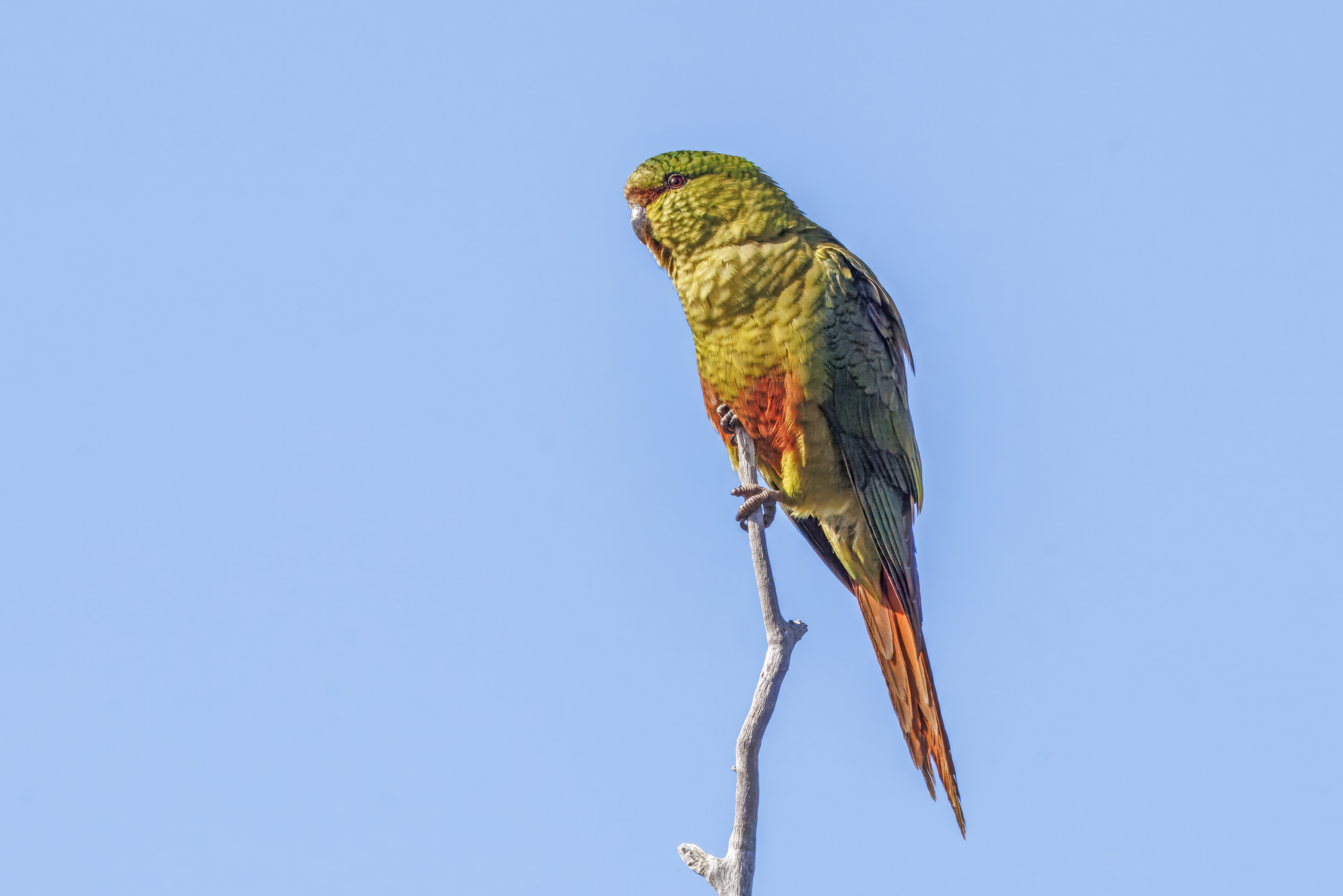
- Enicognathus ferrugineus minor, Argentina

Conservation status
- Least Concern (IUCN 3.1)
- CITES Appendix II

Scientific classification
- Kingdom: Animalia
- Phylum: Chordata
- Class: Aves
- Order: Psittaciformes
- Family: Psittacidae
- Genus: Enicognathus
- Species: E. ferrugineus

Binomial name
- Enicognathus ferrugineus (Müller, 1776)

Synonyms
- Microsittace ferruginea

= Austral parakeet =

Species of bird

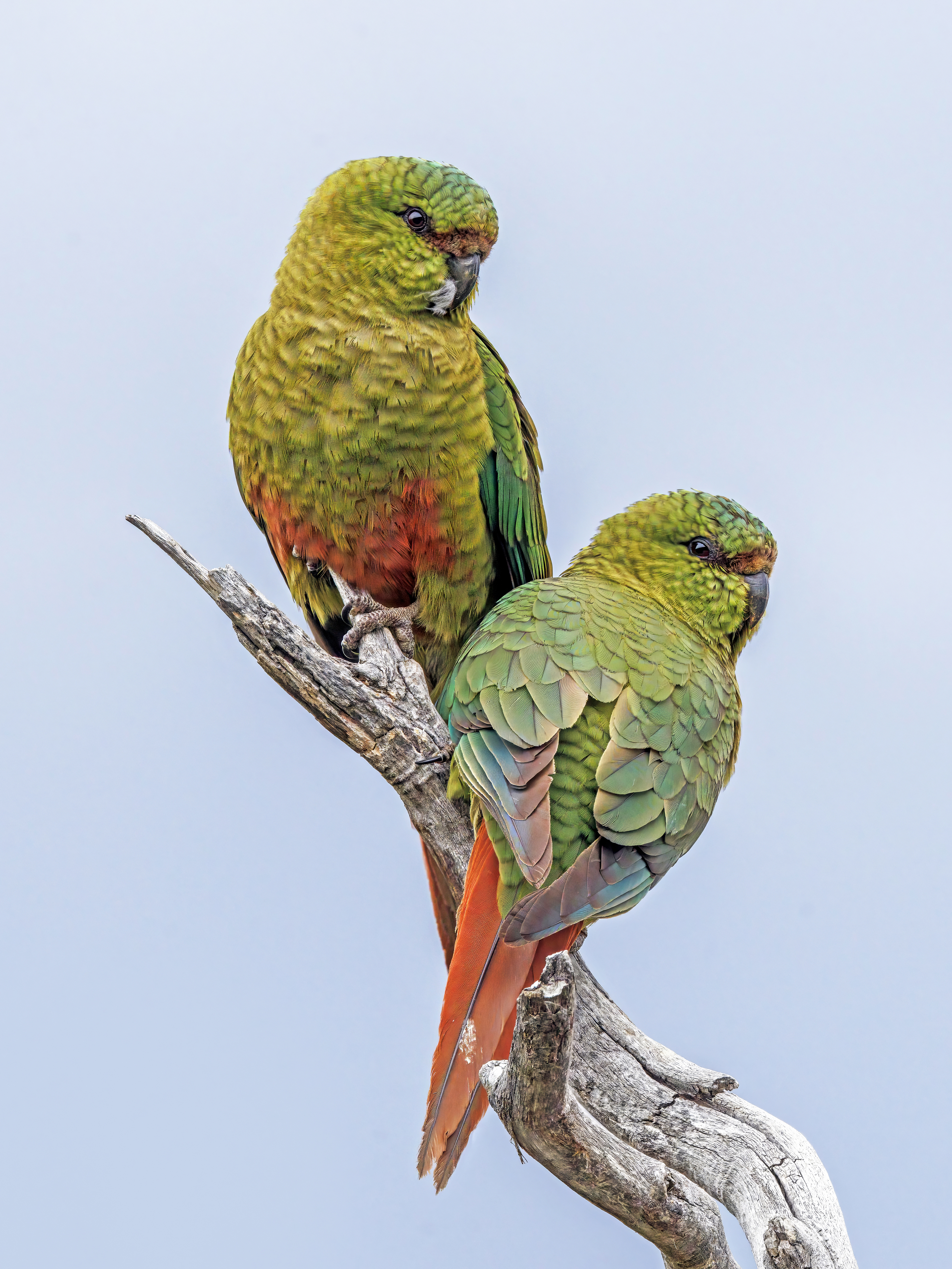
Pair

The austral parakeet, austral conure, cachaña, rawilma or emerald parakeet (Enicognathus ferrugineus) is a species of bird in subfamily Arinae of the family Psittacidae, the African and New World parrots. It is found in Argentina, Chile, and possibly the Falkland Islands.

== Taxonomy ==
The austral parakeet shares genus Enicognathus with the slender-billed parakeet (S. leptorhynchus). Previously it was the sole member of genus Microsittace. It has two subspecies, the nominate E. f. ferrugineus (Müller, 1776) and E. f. minor (Chapman, 1919).

== Description ==
The austral parakeet is 28 to 36 cm (11 to 14 in) long; a specimen of a male E. f. minor weighed 155 g (5.5 oz). The sexes are the same. Adults of the nominate subspecies have a dull reddish forehead and lores in an otherwise yellow-green face. Their upperparts are dull green. Their underparts are yellowish green with a dull reddish patch on the belly; dark feather edges give a scaly appearance. Their tail is also dull reddish; their wings are mostly green with bluish green primaries. Immature birds are similar but the red of the face and belly are even duller. Subspecies E. f. minor is smaller and darker than the nominate.

== Distribution and habitat ==
The austral parakeet is the southernmost of all parrots. Subspecies E. f. minor is found in southern Chile from the O'Higgins Region south to Aysén and in adjoining southwestern Argentina from Neuquén Province to northwestern Santa Cruz. The nominate subspecies is found from minor's southern limit almost to Cape Horn. Undocumented sight records in the Falkland Islands lead the South American Classification Committee of the American Ornithological Society to class it as hypothetical there.

The austral parakeet primarily inhabits southern beech (Nothofagus) forest and woodlands dominated by oaks (Quercus) and Drimys andina. It also occurs in nearby semi-open areas, ranchlands, and occasionally in cultivated areas. It is mostly found near sea level in the far south but ranges as high as 2,000 m (6,600 ft) in the north.

== Behavior ==
=== Movement ===
The austral parakeet is a year-round resident in the southern part of its range. In the north it makes elevational movements that appear to not be strictly seasonal but more in response to weather and food availability.

=== Feeding ===
The austral parakeet often forages in flocks that can have as many as 100 individuals and may include other bird species as well. Its diet includes seeds of grasses, bamboo, and the "Chilean pine" Araucaria araucana, and also fruits, berries, acorns, and leaf buds. In the northernmost part of its Argentinian range it has been observed feeding on insect larvae.

=== Breeding ===
The austral parakeet's breeding season is not fully defined but includes December. It usually nests in tree cavities; those in large dead oaks seem to be favored. It has also been reported making a twig nest in bamboo. The clutch size is five to eight eggs; in captivity the incubation period is about 26 days.

=== Vocalization ===
The austral parakeet's most common call is "a nasal grating note, typically repeated in long series, e.g. "grrreh-grrreh-grrreh..."." It often mixes in a "more drawn-out higher-pitched "kreeh" ."

== Conservation status ==
The IUCN has assessed the austral parakeet as being of Least Concern. It has a large range and though its population size is not known it is believed to be stable. No immediate threats have been identified. It is considered common throughout its range and much of its habitat is protected in national parks.
