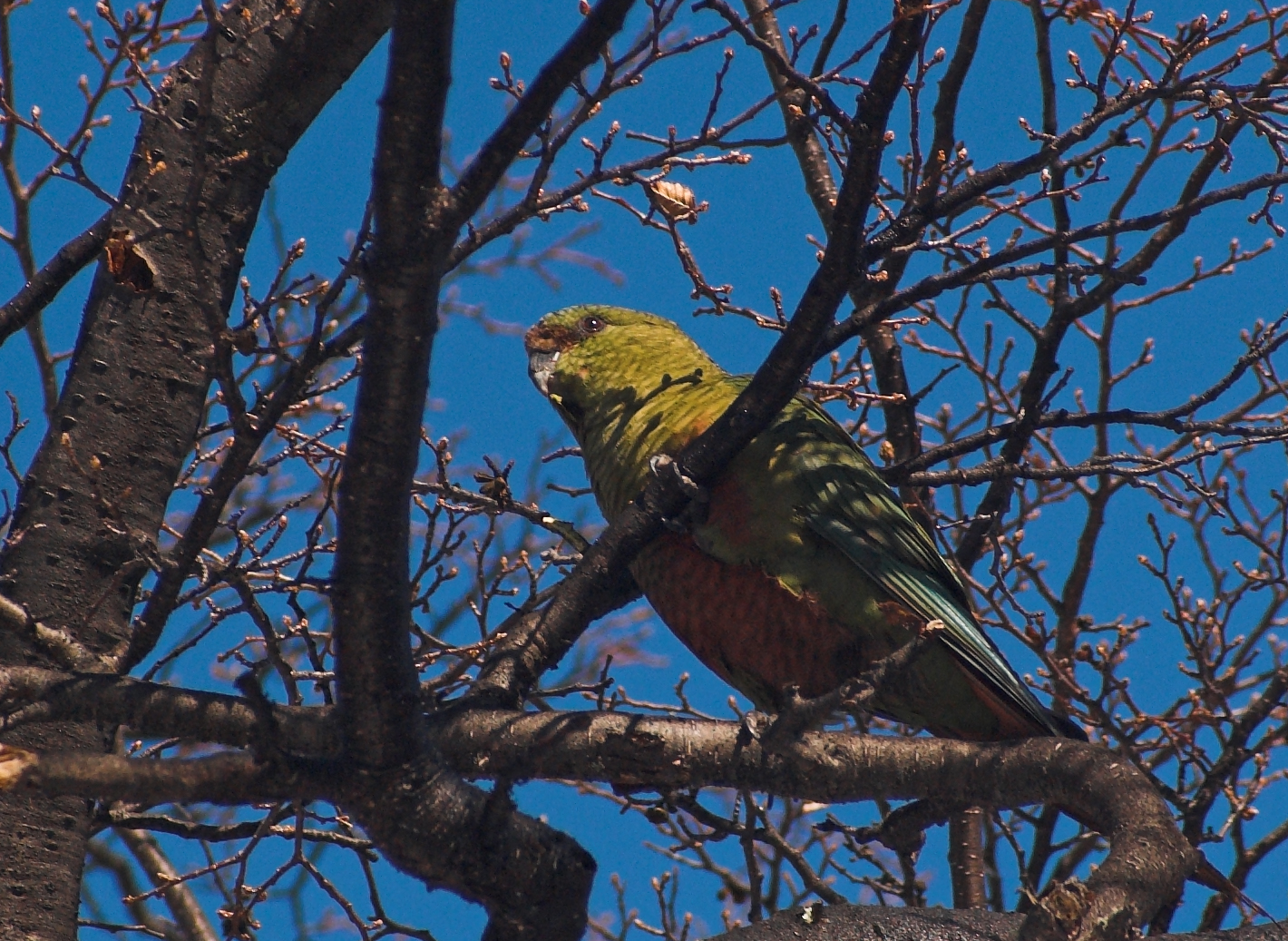
- Austral parakeet

Scientific classification
- Kingdom: Animalia
- Phylum: Chordata
- Class: Aves
- Order: Psittaciformes
- Family: Psittacidae
- Tribe: Arini
- Genus: Enicognathus; G.R. Gray, 1840

Type species
- Psittacara leptorhyncha P.P. King, 1831

Species
- see text

= Enicognathus =

Genus of birds

Enicognathus is a genus of South American parrots in the family Psittacidae.

== Species ==
It contains these species:

Genus Enicognathus – G.R. Gray, 1840 – two species
Common name	Scientific name and subspecies	Range	Size and ecology	IUCN status and estimated population
Slender-billed parakeet	Enicognathus leptorhynchus (King, 1831)	southern Chile	Size: Habitat: Diet:	LC
Austral parakeet	Enicognathus ferrugineus (Müller, 1776)	southern tip of South America	Size: Habitat: Diet:	LC
