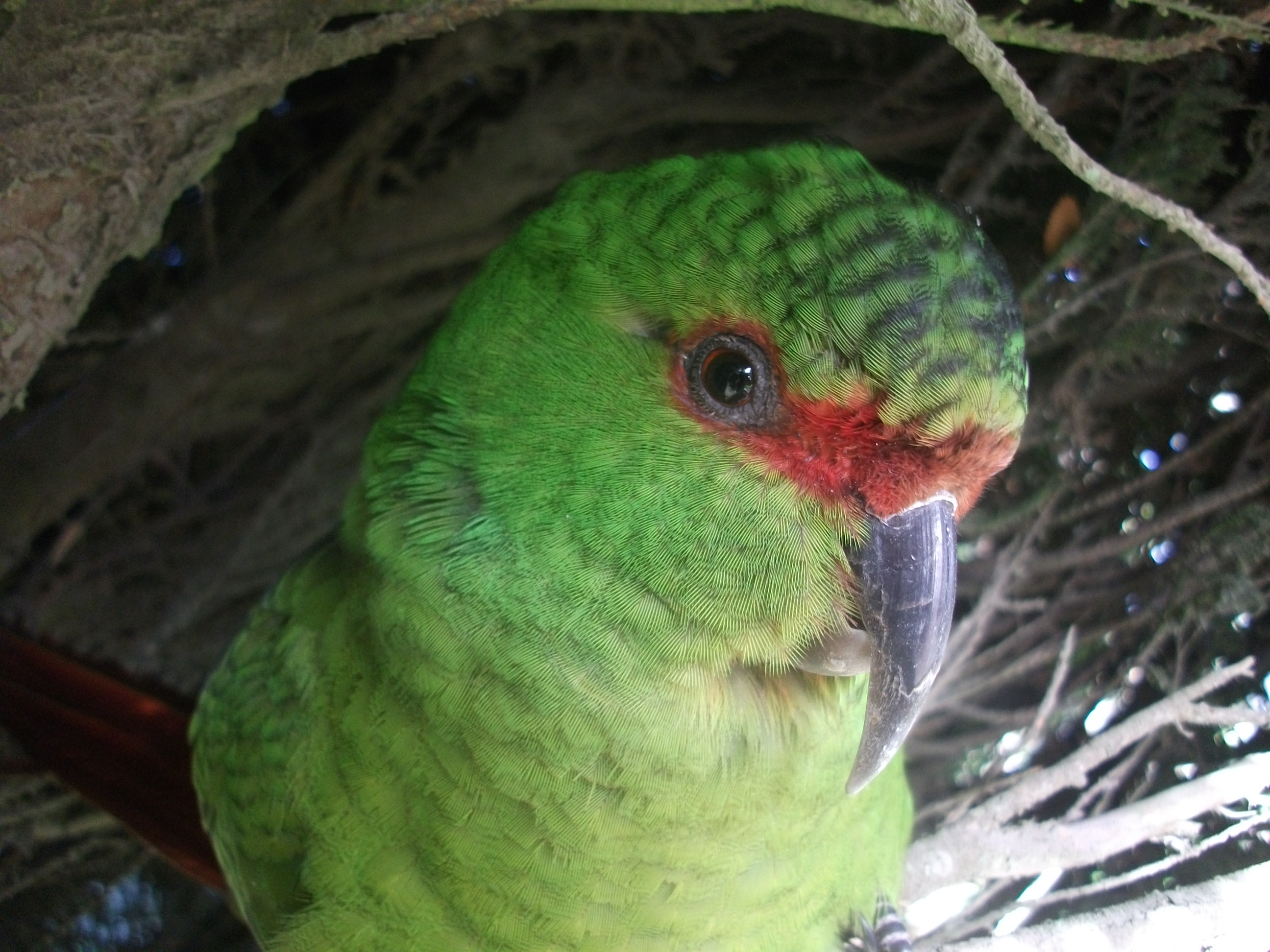

Conservation status
- Least Concern (IUCN 3.1)
- CITES Appendix II

Scientific classification
- Kingdom: Animalia
- Phylum: Chordata
- Class: Aves
- Order: Psittaciformes
- Family: Psittacidae
- Genus: Enicognathus
- Species: E. leptorhynchus

Binomial name
- Enicognathus leptorhynchus (King, 1831)
- Approximate range in green

Synonyms
- Enicognathus byroni

= Slender-billed parakeet =

Species of bird

The slender-billed parakeet (Enicognathus leptorhynchus) or choroy, is a species of bird in subfamily Arinae of the family Psittacidae, the African and New World parrots. It is endemic to Chile, where it is known by the local common name choroy.

== Taxonomy and systematics ==
The slender-billed parakeet has also been named Enicognathus byroni, but the current specific epithet leptorhynchus has priority. It shares its genus with the austral parakeet (E. ferrugineus) and is monotypic.

== Description ==
The slender-billed parakeet is about 40 cm (16 in) long. The species' English name comes from its greatly elongated mandible. The sexes are the same. Adults have a red forehead and lores in an otherwise yellow-green face. Their upperparts are dull green. Their underparts are yellowish green with a reddish patch on the belly. Their tail is also reddish; their wings are mostly green with bluish green primaries. Immature birds are similar to adults but are a darker green and have whitish skin around the eye.

== Distribution and habitat ==
The slender-billed parakeet is endemic to central Chile between the Santiago Metropolitan Region and Los Lagos Region; it also occurs in the Aysén Region, but rarely, and has been recorded as a vagrant in Argentina.

The slender-billed parakeet primarily inhabits southern beech (Nothofagus) and Chilean pine (Araucaria araucana) forest. It also occurs in nearby semi-open areas, ranchlands, and in cultivated areas, all of them usually in winter. In elevation it ranges as high as 2,000 m (6,600 ft).

== Behavior ==
=== Movement ===
The slender-billed parakeet moves from the upper elevations to lower ones in the austral winter months of May through September.

=== Feeding ===
The slender-billed parakeet's year-round diet includes seeds of grass and thistle, buds, and berries. In autumn the seeds of Araucaria are a major component; it appears that its unusual bill is adapted to feed on them. Seeds of Nothofagus are also important at other times of the year. It is a serious agricultural pest on Chiloé Island.

=== Breeding ===
The slender-billed parakeet breeds between November and February. It usually nests in tree cavities and is known to add twigs to raise a deep cavities's floor. Often several pairs will nest in the same tree. It also occasionally uses rock crevices and has been recorded making a twig nest in bamboo. At least one nest held 10 eggs but they were suspected of being laid by two females; another nest held five eggs. The incubation period is about 26 to 28 days and fledging occurs about 42 to 45 days after hatch.

=== Vocalization ===
The slender-billed parakeet's most common call is "a nasal grating note, typically repeated in long series, e.g. "grrreh-grrreh-grrreh..."." It also makes "higher-pitched slightly more melodious screeches, "kreeh!" or "kerreh!"."

== Status ==
The IUCN has assessed the slender-billed parakeet as being of Least Concern. It has a fairly large range and though its population size is not known it is believed to be stable. No immediate threats have been identified. Though its population declined in the 1950s and 1960s due to deforestation and other causes, it is still considered fairly common. It is gregarious and roosts communally; roosts of up to 2000 individuals have been noted.
