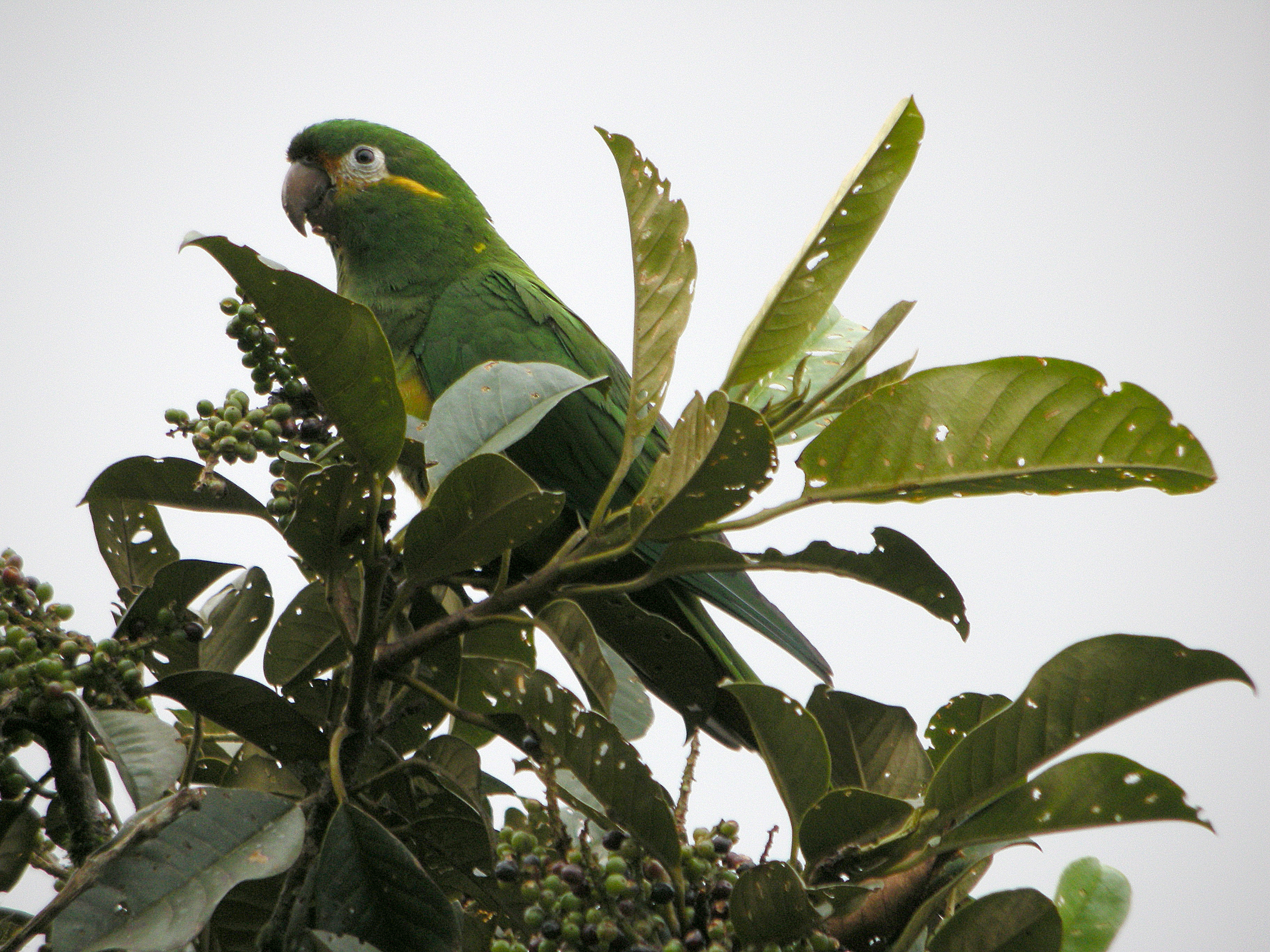
- In Tapichalaca Reserve, Ecuador

Conservation status
- Least Concern (IUCN 3.1)

Scientific classification
- Kingdom: Animalia
- Phylum: Chordata
- Class: Aves
- Order: Psittaciformes
- Family: Psittacidae
- Tribe: Arini
- Genus: Leptosittaca; Berlepsch & Stolzmann, 1894
- Species: L. branickii

Binomial name
- Leptosittaca branickii Berlepsch & Stolzmann, 1894

= Golden-plumed parakeet =

Species of bird

The golden-plumed parakeet (Leptosittaca branickii) is a Neotropical parrot species within the family Psittacidae, belonging to the monotypic genus Leptosittaca. This somewhat Aratinga-like species is found in humid temperate highland forests, especially with Podocarpus, on the east Andean slope in Colombia, Ecuador, and Peru. It is generally local and uncommon. It is threatened by habitat loss. Clearing of high-altitude forests for agricultural reasons have greatly impacted the loss of habitat for this parakeet species. Further reduction of such habitats will continue to diminish the number of golden-plumed parakeets left in South America. It is the only known parakeet species that can detect ultraviolet radiation.

== Description ==
The golden-plumed parakeet is a large and long tailed montane parakeet that resides in the Andean cloud forests of Colombia, Peru, and Ecuador. Adults are mostly bright green with orange-yellow lores and small golden yellow crests behind the eyes. Their bellies are a faded yellowish color with reddish orange feathers scattered about. Golden-plumed parakeets have yellowish flight feathers on their underside as well as strongly reddish color feathers on the underside of their tail. Juveniles strongly resemble the adults, but their bellies are a paler green, yellow, and orange color as well as having pale pink bills.

== Behavior ==
Golden-plumed parakeets usually abide in groups of 5-15 and can be seen in groups as large as 35-40 birds. The golden-plumed parakeet likely has a nomadic movement pattern, leaving the nest when the chicks have fledged and returning next breeding season. Also, they are usually on exposed branches and outer crowns of Wax palms and are very active callers. Their call is a shrill sound that is present in flight and while they are perched, and it can be heard all year and more frequently during nesting areas during the breeding season. During copulation, the males and females share the same perch and gradually approach each other. The male slowly mounts the female and they both raise their long tails, rub together their cloacas, and shake their tails literally for 1–2 minutes.

== Diet ==
They depend on wax palms for shelter and are heavily dependent on Podocarpus cones for food. They spend a lot of their time foraging in the Podocarpus trees.

== Conservation ==
Habitat degradation and fragmentation are the two main threats causing a decline in the number of golden-plumed parakeets in Ecuador. There are only about 7,300-20,000 golden-plumed parakeets mature adults left today as a result of fragmentation and habitat loss. There are conversation sites scattered throughout their region to aid their struggle.

== Predation ==
There is evidence of predation of eggs and chicks by Andean weasels from Ecuador. In the first case, the Andean weasel consumed both the one egg in the nest, as well as the adult parakeet; in the second, the weasel consumed two eggs, a two-week-old chick, and the brain of the adult parakeet. The adult's body and skull were left beneath the nest. The occupation of nesting cavities by western honeybees, both a form of competition and predation, has also been noted as a detrimental factor in the nesting success of golden-plumed parakeets in Ecuador. Bees have been known to occupy both empty nests, as well as active nests with golden-plumed parakeet chicks (Williamson 2011).
