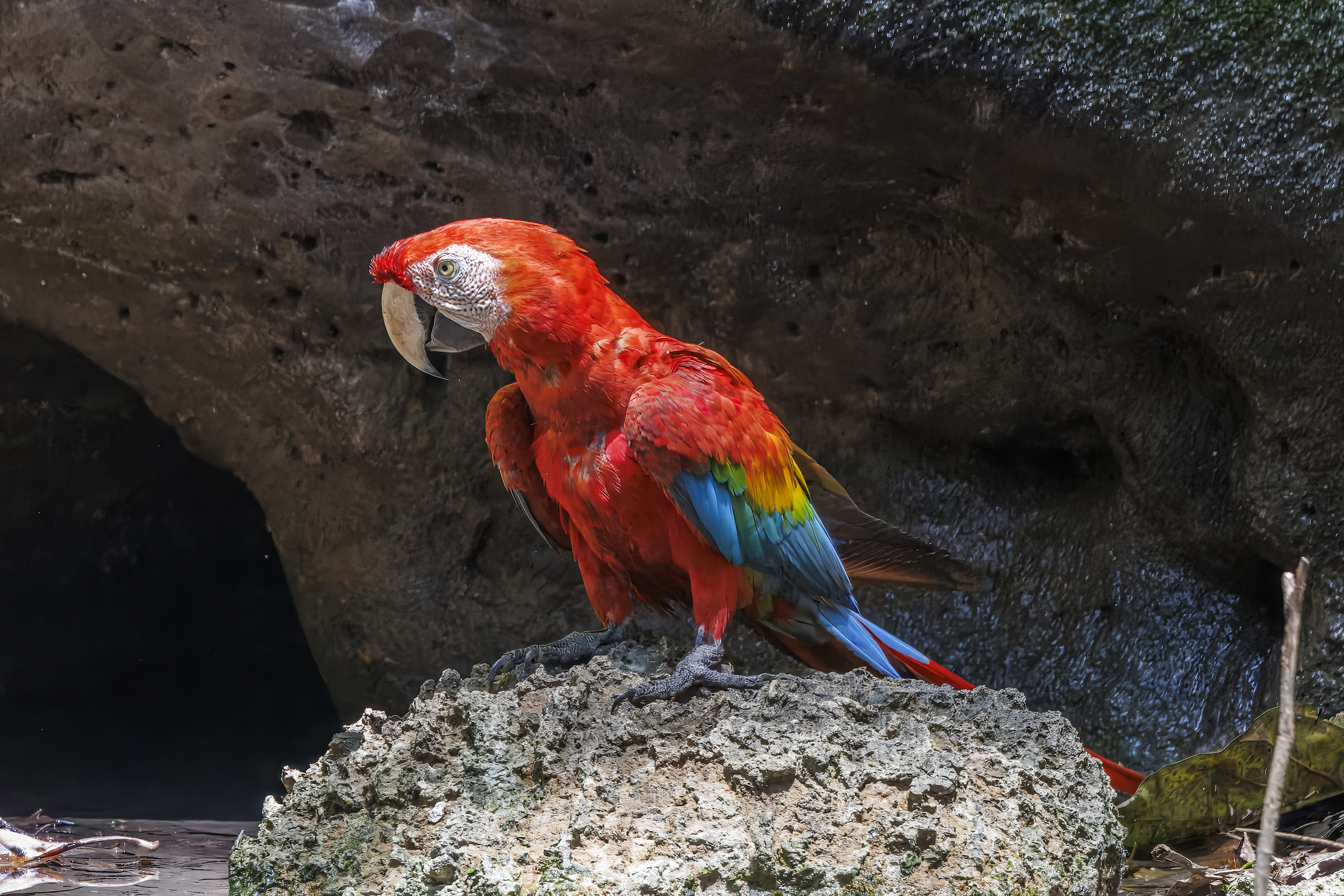
- Scarlet macaw

Scientific classification
- Kingdom: Animalia
- Phylum: Chordata
- Class: Aves
- Order: Psittaciformes
- Superfamily: Psittacoidea
- Family: Psittacidae; Rafinesque, 1815

Subfamilies
- Psittacinae; Arinae; See text for genera.

= Psittacidae =

Psittacidae Temporal range: Eocene-Holocene

Family of birds

The family Psittacidae or holotropical parrots is one of three families of true parrots. It comprises the 12 species of subfamily Psittacinae (the Afrotropical parrots) and 167 of subfamily Arinae (the New World or Neotropical parrots) including several species that have gone extinct in recent centuries. Some of the most iconic birds in the world are represented here, such as the blue-and-yellow macaw among the New World parrots and the grey parrot among the Afrotropical parrots.

== Distribution ==
All of the parrot species in this family are found in tropical and subtropical zones and inhabit Mexico, Central and South America, the Caribbean islands, and sub-Saharan Africa. Three parrots, one extinct and another extirpated, once inhabited the United States.

== Evolutionary history ==
This family probably had its origin early in the Paleogene period, 66–23 million years ago (Mya), after the western half of Gondwana had separated into the continents of Africa and South America, before the divergence of African and New World lineages around 30–35 Mya. The New World parrots, and by implication Old World parrots, last shared a common ancestor with the Australian cockatoos in the family the Cacatuidae approximately 33 Mya.

The data place most of the diversification of psittaciformes around 40 Mya, after the separation of Australia from West Antarctica and South America. Divergence of the Psittacidae from the ancestral parrots resulted from a common radiation event from what was then West Antarctica into South America, then Africa, via late Cretaceous land bridges that survived through the Paleogene.

== Taxonomy ==
The family Psittacidae was introduced (as Psittacea) by French polymath Constantine Samuel Rafinesque in 1815. The recently revised taxonomy of the family Psittacidae, based on molecular studies, recognizes the sister clade relationship of the Old World Psittacini and New World Arini tribes of subfamily Psittacinae, which have been raised to subfamily ranking and renamed Psittacinae and Arinae. Subfamily Loriinae and the other tribes of subfamily Psittacinae are now placed in superfamily Psittacoidea of all true parrots, which includes family Psittacidae.

The following phylogeny shows how the family Psittacidae relates to the three other families in the order Psittaciformes. The tree is based on the work by Leo Joseph and collaborators published in 2012 but with the choice of families and the number of species in each family taken from the list maintained by Frank Gill, Pamela Rasmussen and David Donsker on behalf of the International Ornithological Committee (IOC), now the International Ornithologists' Union.

- Psittaciformes
  - Strigopidae – New Zealand parrots (4 species)
  - - Cacatuidae – Cockatoos (22 species)
    - - Psittacidae – African and New World parrots (178 species)
      - Psittaculidae – Old World parrots (202 species)

The family contains 179 species and is divided into 37 genera. Included are four species that have become extinct in historical times: the glaucous macaw, the Carolina parakeet, the Cuban macaw and the Puerto Rican parakeet. The following cladogram is based on a phylogenetic study by Brian Smith and collaborators that was published in 2023. In the analysis the genera Nannopsittaca, Bolborhynchus and Psilopsiagon were found not to be monophyletic. The number of species in each genus is taken from the IOC list.

- Psittacidae
  - Psittacinae
    - Psittacus – African grey parrots (2 species)
    - Poicephalus – Poicephalus parrots (10 species)
  - Arinae
    - Amoropsittacini
      - Touit – parrotlets (8 species)
      - Nannopsittaca, Bolborhynchus, Psilopsiagon – parrotlets, parakeets (7 species)
    - - Forpini
        Forpus – parrotlets (9 species)
      - - Androglossini
          - - Myiopsitta – Quaker parakeets (2 species)
            - Brotogeris – parakeets (8 species)
          - - Pionopsitta – pileated parrot
            - - Triclaria – blue-bellied parrot
              - - - Hapalopsittaca – parrots (4 species)
                  - Pyrilia – parrots (7 species)
                - - Amazona – Amazon parrots (31 species)
                  - - Pionus – Pionus parrots (8 species)
                    - - Graydidascalus – short-tailed parrot
                      - Alipiopsitta - yellow-faced parrot
        - Arini
          - - Deroptyus – red-fan/hawk-headed parrot
            - Pionites – caiques (2 species)
          - - Rhynchopsitta – thick-billed parrots (2 species)
            - - Pyrrhura – parakeets (24 species)
              - - - Cyanoliseus – burrowing parrot/Patagonian conure
                  - Enicognathus – parakeets (2 species)
                - - Anodorhynchus – blue macaws (3 species)
                  - - - - Conuropsis – † Carolina parakeet
                        - Aratinga – parakeets, sun conure (6 species)
                      - - Cyanopsitta – Spix's macaw
                        - - Orthopsittaca – red-bellied macaw
                          - - Primolius – mini-macaws (3 species)
                            - Ara – macaws (9 species)
                    - - Eupsittula – parakeets (5 species)
                      - - Psittacara – parakeets (12 species)
                        - - - Ognorhynchus – yellow-eared parrot
                            - Leptosittaca – golden-plumed parakeet
                          - - Thectocercus – blue-crowned parakeet
                            - - Guaruba – golden parakeet/Queen of Bavaria's conure
                              - Diopsittaca – red-shouldered/Hahn's/noble macaw

- Subfamily Psittacinae
  - Genus Psittacus – African grey parrots (two species)
  - Genus Poicephalus
  - Genus Bavaripsitta†
- Subfamily Arinae
  - Tribe Arini – macaws and parakeets
    - Genus Anodorhynchus
    - Genus Cyanopsitta
    - Genus Ara
    - Genus Orthopsittaca
    - Genus Primolius
    - Genus Diopsittaca
    - Genus Rhynchopsitta
    - Genus Ognorhynchus
    - Genus Guaruba
    - Genus Leptosittaca
    - Genus Psittacara
    - Genus Aratinga
    - Genus Eupsittula
    - Genus Thectocercus
    - Genus Cyanoliseus
    - Genus Pyrrhura
    - Genus Enicognathus
    - Genus Conuropsis†
  - Tribe Androglossini – Amazon and related parrots
    - Genus Pyrilia
    - Genus Pionopsitta
    - Genus Graydidascalus
    - Genus Alipiopsitta
    - Genus Pionus
    - Genus Amazona
    - Genus Triclaria
  - Clade (proposed tribe Amoropsittacini)
    - Genus Nannopsittaca
    - Genus Psilopsiagon
    - Genus Bolborhynchus
    - Genus Touit
  - Clade (proposed tribe Forpini) – parrotlets
    - Genus Forpus
  - Clade including Arini
    - Genus Pionites – caiques (four species)
    - Genus Deroptyus – red-fan parrot
  - Clade including Androglossini
    - Genus Hapalopsittaca
    - Genus Brotogeris
    - Genus Myiopsitta
