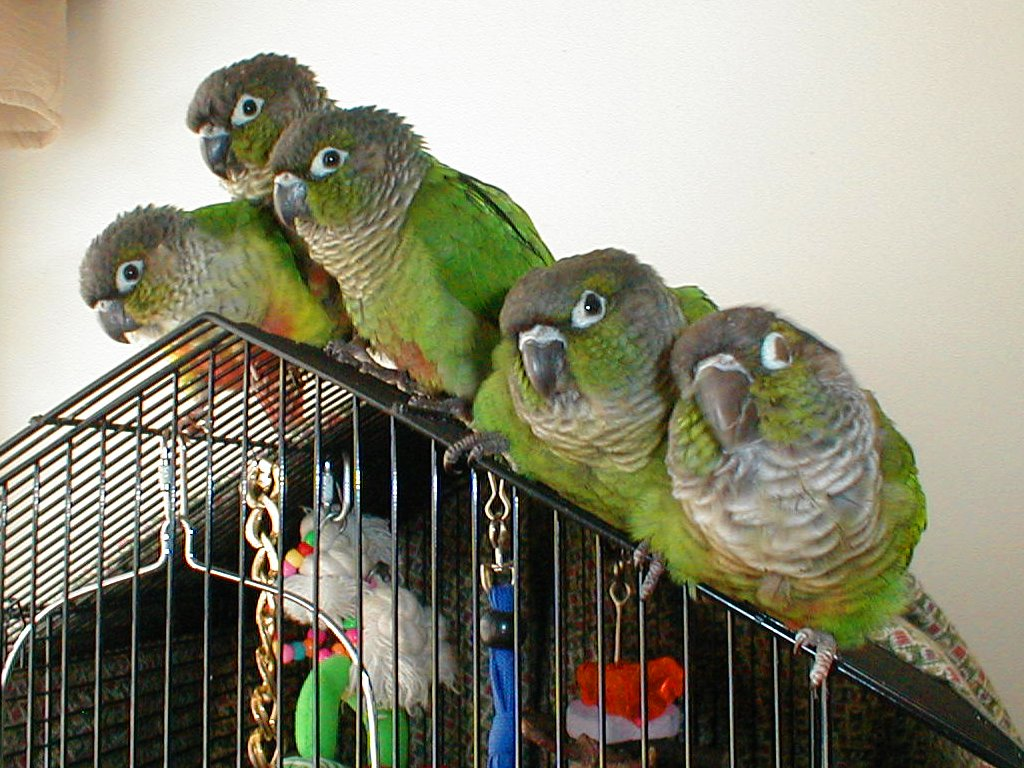
- Green-cheeked parakeet (Pyrrhura molinae)

Scientific classification
- Kingdom: Animalia
- Phylum: Chordata
- Class: Aves
- Order: Psittaciformes
- Family: Psittacidae
- Tribe: Arini
- Genus: Pyrrhura; Bonaparte, 1856

Type species
- Psittacus vittatus Shaw, 1811

Species
- See text.

= Pyrrhura =

Genus of birds

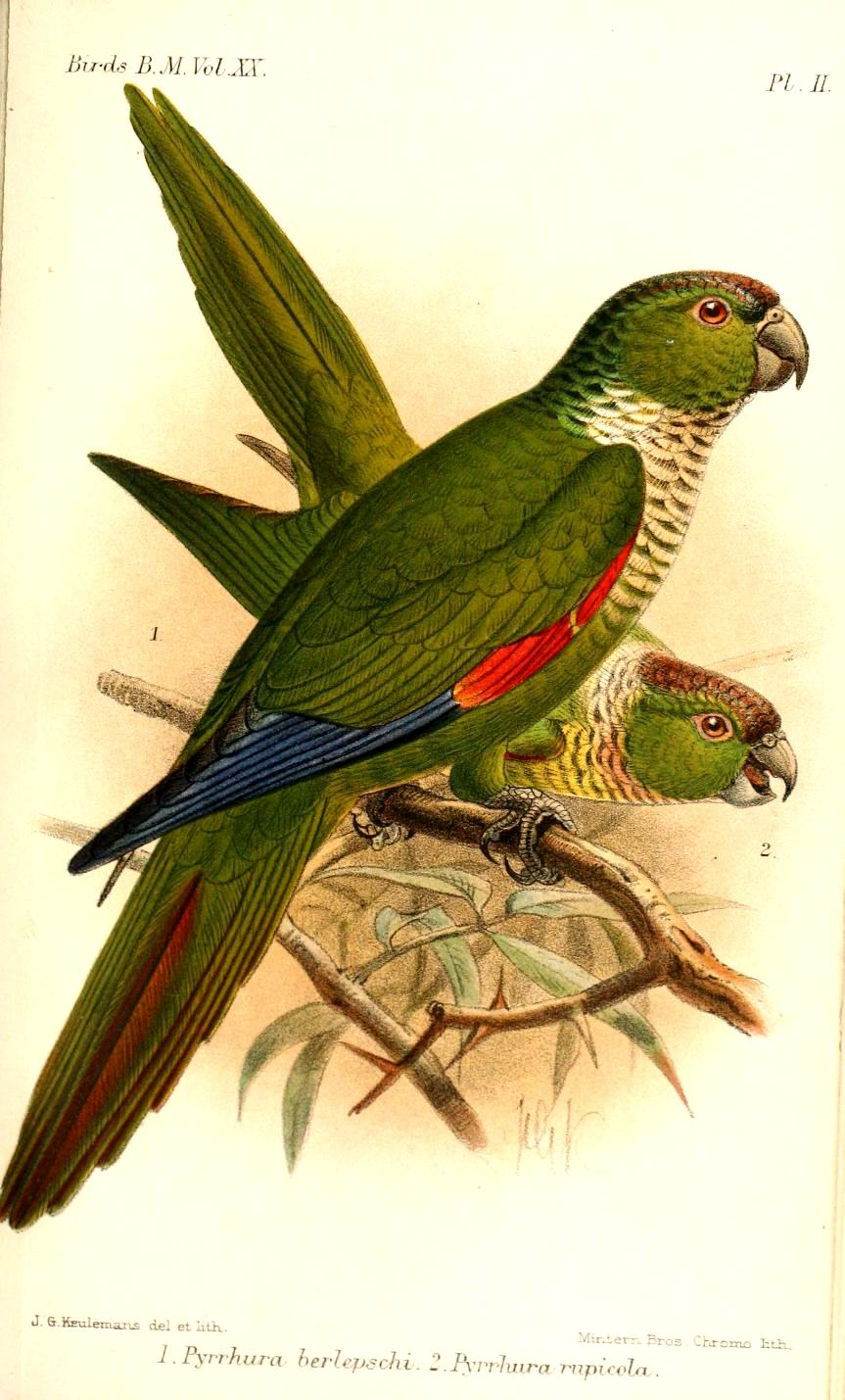
Maroon-tailed parakeet (in front), and black-capped parakeet (behind); illustration by Keulemans, 1891

Pyrrhura (Ancient Greek for red/fire tail) is a genus of parrots in the Arini tribe. They occur in tropical and subtropical South America and southern Central America (Panama and Costa Rica). Most are restricted to humid forest and adjacent habitats, but one species, the blaze-winged parakeet, prefers deciduous or gallery woodland, and another, the Pfrimer's parakeet, is restricted to dry regions. Some species are highly endangered.

Depending on the species, the total length range from 22 to 30 cm (8.7 to 11.8 in). All have long, pointed tails, a mainly green plumage, and a relatively narrow, dark greyish to white eye-ring. Many have scaly or barred chest-patterns and a whitish, pale grey, buff or reddish ear-patch.

They typically move around in small, noisy flocks, flying swiftly at or below canopy level. Once settled in a tree they tend to be silent (especially if aware of danger) and difficult to spot. They nest in a tree-crevice.

Some species are popular in aviculture, where they are commonly referred to as conures instead of parakeets.

== Taxonomy ==
The genus Pyrrhura was introduced in 1856 by the French naturalist Charles Lucien Bonaparte. Bonaparte did not specify a type species but this was designated in 1891 by the Italian zoologist Tommaso Salvadori as Psittacus vittatus Shaw, 1811, which has been replaced by Psittacus frontalis Vieillot, 1818, the maroon-bellied parakeet. The genus name is from the specific epithet of Microsittace pyrrhura Bonaparte, 1854 now Pyrrhura molinae Massena & Souancé, 1854, the green-cheeked parakeet. The name combines the Ancient Greek purrhos meaning "flame-coloured" or "red" with oura meaning "tail".

== Species ==
The genus contains 26 species:

Genus Pyrrhura – Shaw, 1811 – twenty six species
Common name	Scientific name and subspecies	Range	Size and ecology	IUCN status and estimated population
Ochre-marked parakeet	Pyrrhura cruentata (Wied, 1820)	Bahia, Espírito Santo, east Minas Gerais and Rio de Janeiro, Brazil.	Size: Habitat: Diet:	VU
Blaze-winged parakeet	Pyrrhura devillei (Massena & Souancé, 1854)	Brazil, Bolivia, Paraguay, and possibly Argentina.	Size: Habitat: Diet:	LC
Maroon-bellied parakeet	Pyrrhura frontalis (Vieillot, 1818) Two subspecies: P. f. frontalis (Vieillot, 1818); P. f. chiripepe (Vieillot, 1818)	Southern Brazil	Size: Habitat: Diet:	LC
Pearly parakeet	Pyrrhura lepida (Wagler, 1832) Three subspecies: P. l. lepida (Wagler, 1832); P. l. anerythra (Neumann, 1927); P. l. coerulescens (Neumann, 1927)	Brazil(northeastern Pará and northwestern Maranhão)	Size: Habitat: Diet:	VU
Crimson-bellied parakeet	Pyrrhura perlata (Spix, 1824)	Bolivia and Brazil	Size: Habitat: Diet:	LC
Green-cheeked parakeet	Pyrrhura molinae (Massena & Souancé, 1854) Six subspecies: P. m. flavoptera Maijer, Herzog, Kessler, Friggens & Fjeldsa, 1998; P. m. molinae (Massena & Souance, 1854); P. m. phoenicura (Schlegel, 1864); P. m. hypoxantha (Salvadori 1899); P. m. restricta Todd, 1947; P. m. australis Todd, 1915	Argentina, Bolivia, Brazil, and Paraguay	Size: Habitat: Diet:	LC
Pfrimer's parakeet	Pyrrhura pfrimeri Miranda-Ribeiro, 1920	Brazil (Goiás and Tocantins)	Size: Habitat: Diet:	EN
Grey-breasted parakeet	Pyrrhura griseipectus Salvadori, 1900	Brazilian (Ceará, Bahia)	Size: Habitat: Diet:	EN
White-eared parakeet	Pyrrhura leucotis (Kuhl, 1820)	Brazil (Bahia south to Rio de Janeiro state)	Size: Habitat: Diet:	VU
Painted parakeet	Pyrrhura picta (Müller, 1776)	southeastern Venezuela to the Guianas and northern Amazonian Brazil	Size: Habitat: Diet:	LC
Subandean parakeet	Pyrrhura subandina (Todd, 1917) Two subspecies: Azuero parakeet, P. s. eisenmanni Delgado, JA, 1985; Sinú parakeet, P. s. subandina Todd, WEC, 1917	Panama, Colombia	Size: Habitat: Diet:	CR
Perija parakeet	Pyrrhura caeruleiceps (Todd, 1947) Two subspecies: P. c. caeruliceps; P. c. pantchenko	Colombia and Venezuela.	Size: Habitat: Diet:	EN
Venezuelan parakeet	Pyrrhura emma Salvadori, 1891	Venezuela	Size: Habitat: Diet:	LC
Santarem parakeet	Pyrrhura amazonum Hellmayr, 1906 Three subspecies: P. a. amazonum Hellmayr, 1906; P. a. pallescens Miranda-Ribeiro, 1926; P. a. lucida Arndt, 2008	Brazil and Bolivia.	Size: Habitat: Diet:	NT
Bonaparte's parakeet	Pyrrhura lucianii (Deville, 1851)	Brazilian (Amazonas)	Size: Habitat: Diet:	LC
Rose-fronted parakeet	Pyrrhura roseifrons (Gray, 1859) Four subspecies: P. r. peruviana Hocking, Blake & Joseph, 2002; P. r. dilutissima Arndt, 2008; P. r. parvifrons Arndt, 2008; P. r. roseifrons (Gray, 1859)	Ecuador, Peru, Bolivia, Brazil	Size: Habitat: Diet:	LC
Santa Marta parakeet	Pyrrhura viridicata Todd, 1913	northern Colombia	Size: Habitat: Diet:	EN
Fiery-shouldered parakeet	Pyrrhura egregia (Sclater, PL, 1881) Two subspecies: P. e. egregia; P. e. obscura	Guyana, Brazil and Venezuela	Size: Habitat: Diet:	LC
Maroon-tailed parakeet	Pyrrhura melanura (Spix, 1824) Five subspecies: P. m. pacifica Chapman, 1915; P. m. chapmani Bond & Meyer de Schauensee, 1940; P. m. melanura (Spix, 1824); P. m. souancei (Verreaux, 1858); P. m. berlepschi Salvadori, 1891	Brazil, Colombia, Ecuador, Peru, and Venezuela.	Size: Habitat: Diet:	LC
El Oro parakeet	Pyrrhura orcesi Ridgely & Robbins, 1988	Ecuador.	Size: Habitat: Diet:	EN
Black-capped parakeet	Pyrrhura rupicola (Tschudi, 1844) Two subspecies: P. r. rupicola; P. r. sandiae	Peru, Bolivia and Brazil.	Size: Habitat: Diet:	LC
White-breasted parakeet	Pyrrhura albipectus Chapman, 1914	Ecuador, Peru	Size: Habitat: Diet:	VU
Flame-winged parakeet	Pyrrhura calliptera (Massena & Souancé, 1854)	Colombia	Size: Habitat: Diet:	VU
Blood-eared parakeet	Pyrrhura hoematotis (Souancé, 1857) Two subspecies: P. h. hoematotis (Souancé, 1857); P. h. immarginata (Zimmer & W.H. Phelps, 1944)	Venezuela	Size: Habitat: Diet:	NT
Rose-crowned parakeet	Pyrrhura rhodocephala (Sclater, PL & Salvin, 1871)	Venezuela	Size: Habitat: Diet:	LC
Sulphur-winged parakeet	Pyrrhura hoffmanni (Cabanis, 1861) Two subspecies: P. h. hoffmanni (Cabanis, 1861); P. h. gaudens (Bangs, 1906)	Costa Rica and Panama.	Size: Habitat: Diet:	LC
