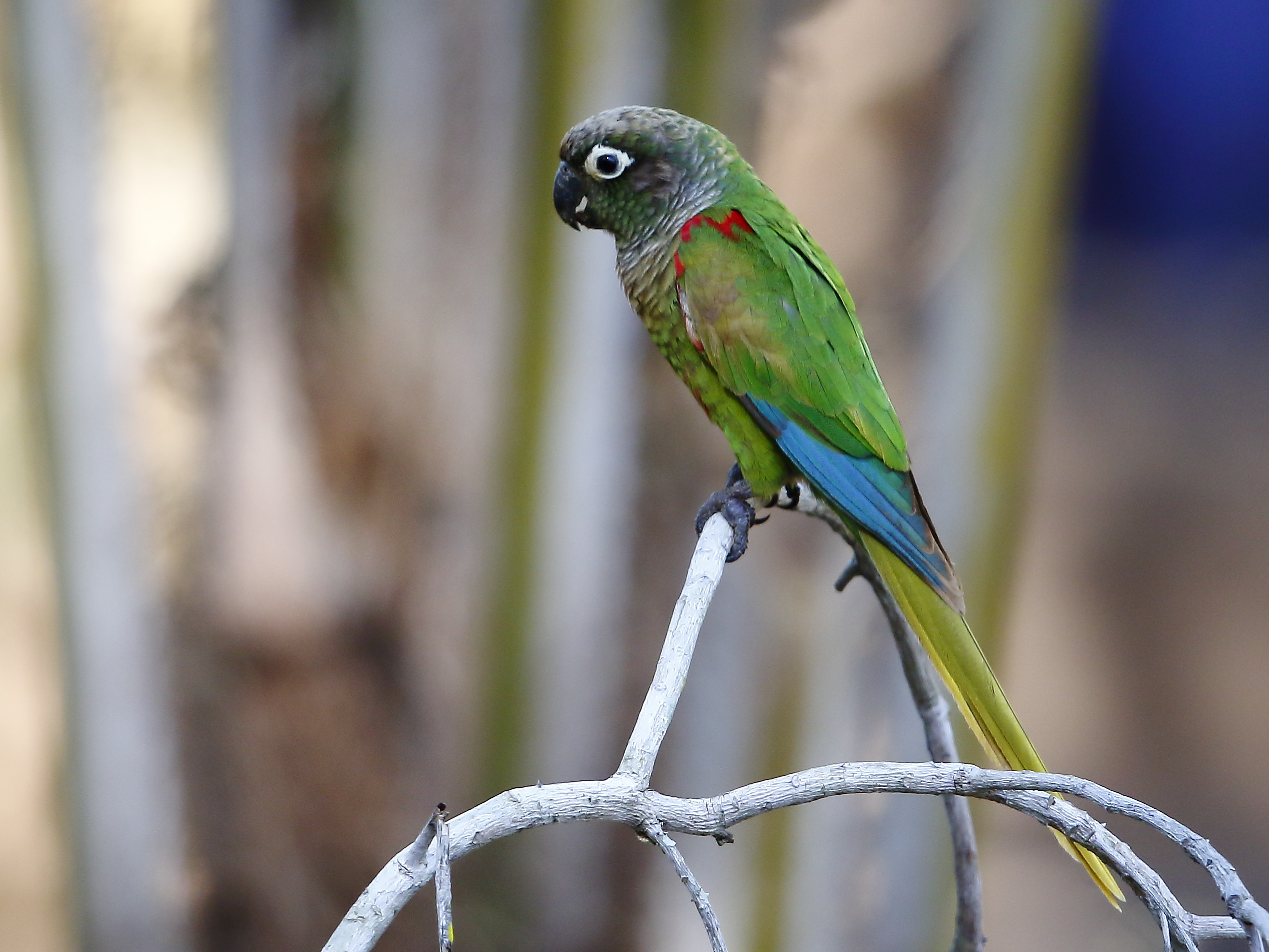

Conservation status
- Least Concern (IUCN 3.1)
- CITES Appendix II

Scientific classification
- Kingdom: Animalia
- Phylum: Chordata
- Class: Aves
- Order: Psittaciformes
- Family: Psittacidae
- Genus: Pyrrhura
- Species: P. devillei

Binomial name
- Pyrrhura devillei (Massena & Souancé, 1854)

Synonyms
- Pyrrhura frontalis devillei

= Blaze-winged parakeet =

Species of bird

The blaze-winged parakeet (Pyrrhura devillei), known as the blaze-winged conure in aviculture, is a species of bird in subfamily Arinae of the family Psittacidae, the African and New World parrots. It is found in Brazil, Bolivia, Paraguay, and possibly Argentina.

== Taxonomy and systematics ==
The blaze-winged parakeet is closely related to the maroon-bellied parakeet (P. frontalis) and they may be conspecific. The blaze-winged parakeet hybridizes with P. f. chiripepe where their ranges overlap in Paraguay. The blaze-winged parakeet is monotypic.

== Description ==
The blaze-winged parakeet is 25 to 26 cm (9.8 to 10 in) long. The sexes are the same. Adults have a brownish crown and reddish brown ear coverts; the rest of their face is yellowish green. Their upperparts are green. Their chin, the sides of their neck, and their breast are yellowish green; brown feather edges give a scaly appearance. The center of their belly is maroon and the rest of their underparts are the same green as their upperparts. Their wing is mostly green, with blue primaries, a red carpal area, and red and yellow underwing coverts. Their tail's top surface is olive green with maroon on the outer third, and the lower surface is dull rufous brown.

== Distribution and habitat ==
The blaze-winged parakeet is found in the Brazilian state of Mato Grosso do Sul and in northeastern Paraguay's Alto Paraguay and Concepción departments. Though the type specimen is noted as having been collected in Bolivia, the area is now believed to be part of Paraguay. Undocumented sight records in Argentina lead the South American Classification Committee of the American Ornithological Society to list it as hypothetical in that country.

The blaze-winged parakeet inhabits parts of the Pantanal and Chaco, where it occurs mostly in deciduous and gallery forest. It is also found in the ecotones between those habitats and adjoining scrublands and savannah.

== Behavior ==
=== Movements ===
The blaze-winged parakeet's movements, if any, have not been determined.

=== Feeding ===
The blaze-winged parakeet feeds on fruits, seeds, and nuts.

=== Breeding ===
Nothing is known about the blaze-winged parakeet's breeding biology in the wild. In captivity it lays four to six eggs with an incubation period of 22 days and fledging seven to eight weeks after hatch.

=== Vocalization ===
The blaze-winged parakeet's most common call is "a series of rather high-pitched shrill notes, e.g. "krree krree krree" ", which it makes both from a perch and in flight. However, perched birds are often silent. Flocks in flight "call frequently and simultaneously, producing a noisy, harsh and piercing chattering."

== Status ==
The IUCN originally assessed the blaze-winged parakeet as being of Least Concern, then in 2009 as Near Threatened, and then in 2021 again as of Least Concern. It has a somewhat limited range that is "remote and largely undisturbed". Logging, conversion of habitat to small-scale farming and ranching, and the pet trade are potential threats but none of them appear to be major problems. The species is considered rare to uncommon in Paraguay and locally common in Brazil.
