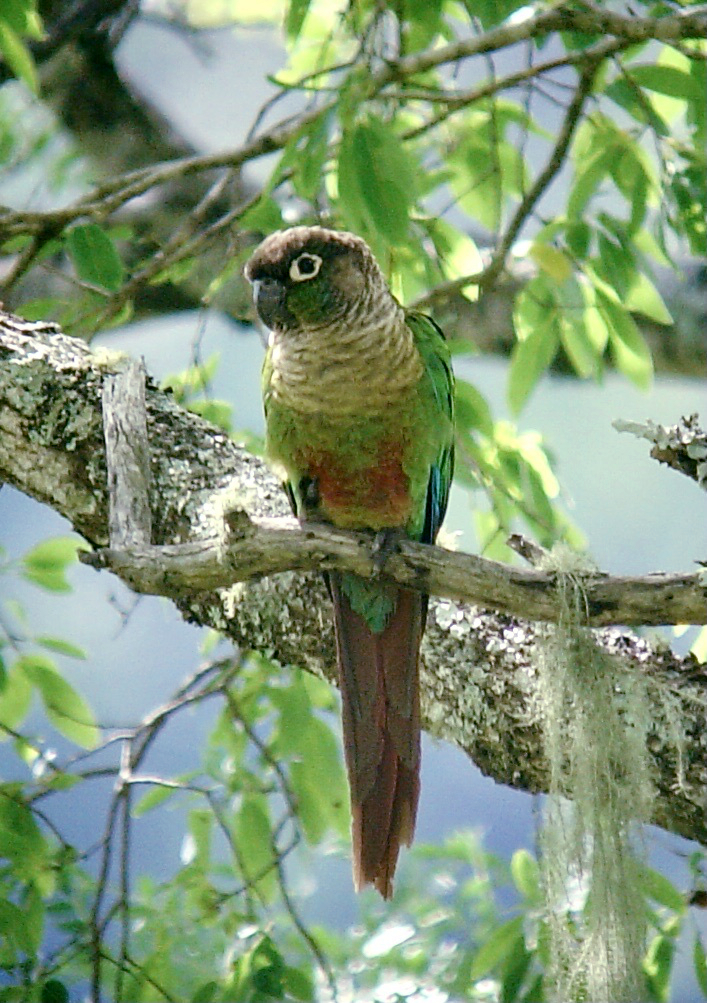
- Nominate Pyrrhura molinae molinae in central Bolivia

Conservation status
- Least Concern (IUCN 3.1)
- CITES Appendix II

Scientific classification
- Kingdom: Animalia
- Phylum: Chordata
- Class: Aves
- Order: Psittaciformes
- Family: Psittacidae
- Genus: Pyrrhura
- Species: P. molinae

Binomial name
- Pyrrhura molinae (Massena & Souancé, 1854)
- Green-cheeked parakeet range

= Green-cheeked parakeet =

Species of bird

The green-cheeked parakeet (Pyrrhura molinae), also sometimes known as the green-cheeked conure in aviculture, is a species of bird in subfamily Arinae of the family Psittacidae, aka the parrots. It is found in Argentina, Bolivia, Brazil, and Paraguay. It is also a popular pet bird.

== Taxonomy and systematics ==
The green-cheeked parakeet has six subspecies:

- P. m. flavoptera Maijer, Herzog, Kessler, Friggens & Fjeldsa, 1998
- P. m. molinae (Massena & Souance, 1854)
- P. m. phoenicura (Schlegel, 1864)
- P. m. hypoxantha (Salvadori 1899)
- P. m. restricta Todd, 1947
- P. m. australis Todd, 1915

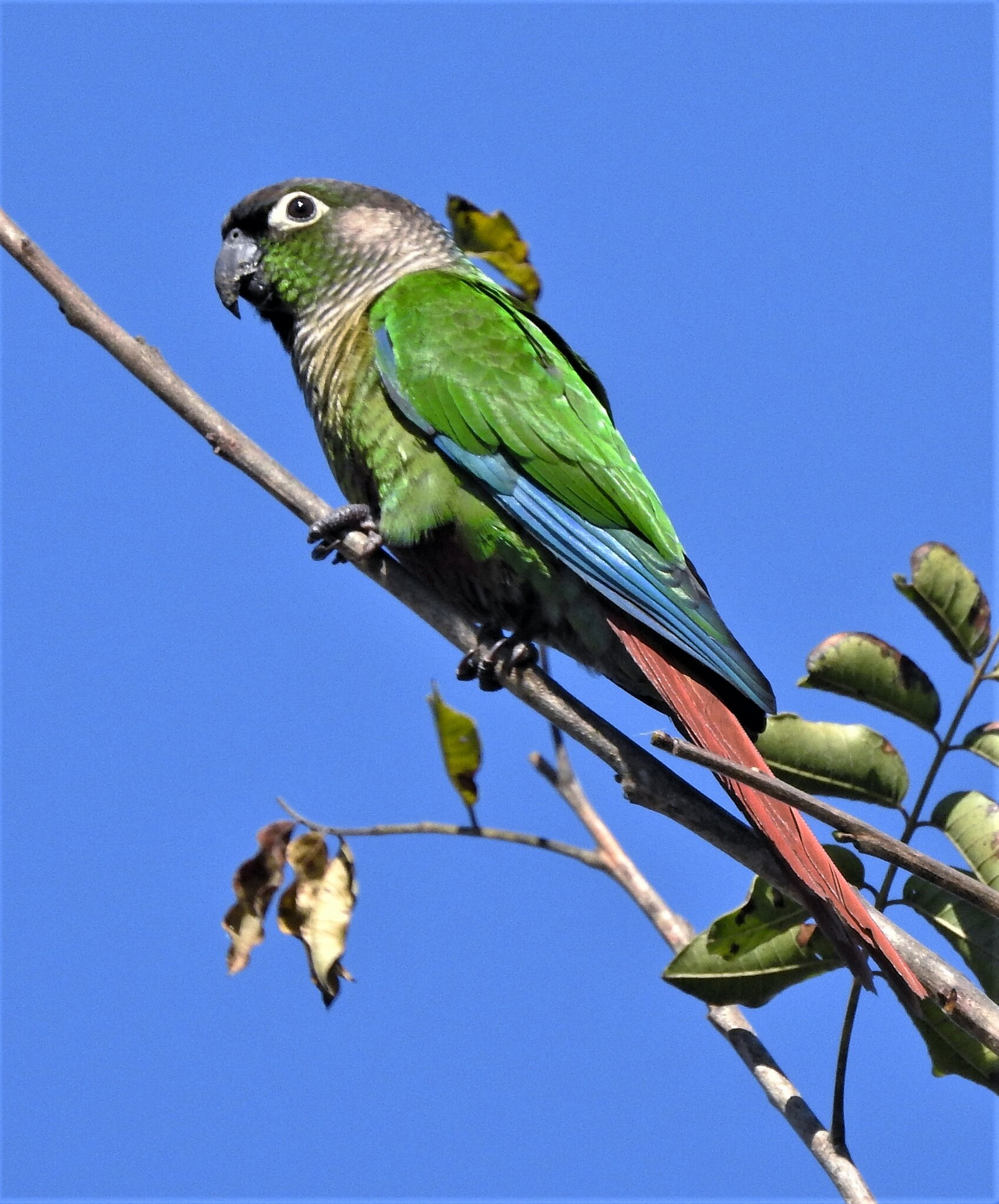
P. m. australis in Jujuy, Argentina

Subspecies P. m. hypoxantha was previously known as P. m. sordida and was sometimes treated as a separate species. However, by the principle of priority the older name hypoxantha replaced sordida. The green-cheeked parakeet has also been treated as conspecific with the maroon-bellied parakeet (P. frontalis).

The green-cheeked parakeet is most closely related to the maroon-bellied, pearly (P. lepida), and crimson-bellied (P. perlata) parakeets.

== Description ==
The green-cheeked parakeet is 25 to 26 cm (9.8 to 10 in) long and weighs 62 to 81 g (2.2 to 2.9 oz). The sexes are the same sizes. Adults of the nominate subspecies P. m. molinae are dull brown from forehead to nape and have green cheeks, ashy brown ear coverts, and a creamy white ring of bare skin around the eye. Their upperparts are green. Their chin, throat, and the sides of their neck are a scaly brown and whitish. Their belly is dull reddish and their lower flanks and vent area are green. Their wing is mostly green, with bluish flight feathers. Their tail is dull reddish. Immatures are similar to adults but without the red belly.

Subspecies P. m. phoenicura is green on the upper surface of its tail's base. P. m. restricta has a blue collar, a blue tinge on its cheeks, and a smaller red belly patch than the nominate. P. m. hypoxantha has a paler crown and less distinct scaling on the breast than the nominate. P. m. australis is paler than the nominate and has a larger red belly patch. P. m. flavoptera is orange to red at the bend of the wing and on the carpal edge and is otherwise like the nominate.

A small number of individuals of P. m. hypoxantha have mostly yellow underparts.

== Distribution and habitat ==
The subspecies of the green-cheeked parakeet are found thus:

- P. m. flavoptera, west-central Bolivia in southeastern La Paz and northwestern Cochabamba departments
- P. m. molinae, Bolivia between La Paz and Chuquisaca departments
- P. m. phoenicura, northeastern Santa Cruz Department in northeastern Bolivia and southwestern Mato Grosso in Brazil
- P. m. hypoxantha, eastern Santa Cruz Department in extreme eastern Bolivia, western Mato Grosso do Sul in southwestern Brazil, and northern Paraguay
- P. m. restricta, central Santa Cruz Department in east-central Bolivia
- P. m. australis, from southern Bolivia's Tarija Department into northwestern Argentina as far as Tucumán Province

The green-cheeked parakeet inhabits lowland woodlands and forest (chiefly deciduous), secondary forest, and gallery forest in the lower elevations of the Pantanal and humid subtropical forest as high as 2,000 m (6,600 ft).

== Behavior ==
=== Movement ===
The populations of green-cheeked parakeet breeding in higher elevations move to lower ones in winter.

=== Feeding ===
The green-cheeked parakeet has a varied diet that, in the wild, consists of fruits, seeds, flowers, and to a rare time, nectar and leaves.

=== Breeding ===
The green-cheeked parakeet's breeding season in Argentina includes February, but its season elsewhere has not been defined. It nests in tree cavities. In captivity the clutch size is four to six eggs, the incubation period is 22 to 25 days, both sexes incubate the clutch, and fledging occurs about seven weeks after hatch.

=== Vocalization ===
The green-cheeked parakeet's flight calls "comprise rather high-pitched notes with a grating quality and usually given in fast series, e.g. "krree krree krree", but also single "kuree" notes." From a perch it "utters high-pitched, more melodious notes, such as a bisyllabic "rrekeet" or "keew"." However, perched birds are often silent. Flocks in flight "call frequently and simultaneously, producing a noisy, harsh and piercing chattering."

== Status ==
The IUCN has assessed the green-cheeked parakeet as being of Least Concern. It has a fairly large range but its population size is not known and is believed to be decreasing. No immediate threats have been identified. It is considered common in much of its range.

== In aviculture ==
Green-cheeked parakeets are common in aviculture and are popular companion parrots. They are considered, affectionate and intelligent. They can learn to talk, albeit with a limited vocabulary and a gravelly voice. Green-cheeked parakeets are relatively quiet for a domestic bird species, making them suitable for prospective bird owners who share walls with neighbours; they are the quietest of the conures.

When cared for properly, captive green-cheeked parakeets can live 25–30 years. However, their average lifespan in captivity is closer to 10 years, due to frequent neglect and/or an incorrect diet.

=== Color variations ===
In addition to the natural color forms, color varieties have been selectively bred in aviculture:

- Cinnamon are lime green and have a lighter, paler coloring. The head is tan and the tail feathers are a lighter maroon compared to normal green-cheeked parakeets.
- Yellow-sided have bright-colored breasts that graduate from red to yellow and dark gray heads. Rarely, they also possess a bright yellow feather on each side of the upper wing. This is a rare recessive character of which only one hatchling in approximately 10 clutches can be found to have. This feature often increases their value.
- Pineapple are a combination of the cinnamon and yellow-sided variations. They have a breast of bright colors, a tan head and lime green feathers on the back like a cinnamon green-cheeked parrot. The tail feathers are the same as a yellow-sided, providing a halo effect.
- Turquoise have a body with some blue-green and green feathers. The end of the wing feathers have a highly iridescent quality if left unclipped. The breast feathers are grayish and the tail feathers are gray.
- Green/red/blue apple varieties are less common, but have been seen.
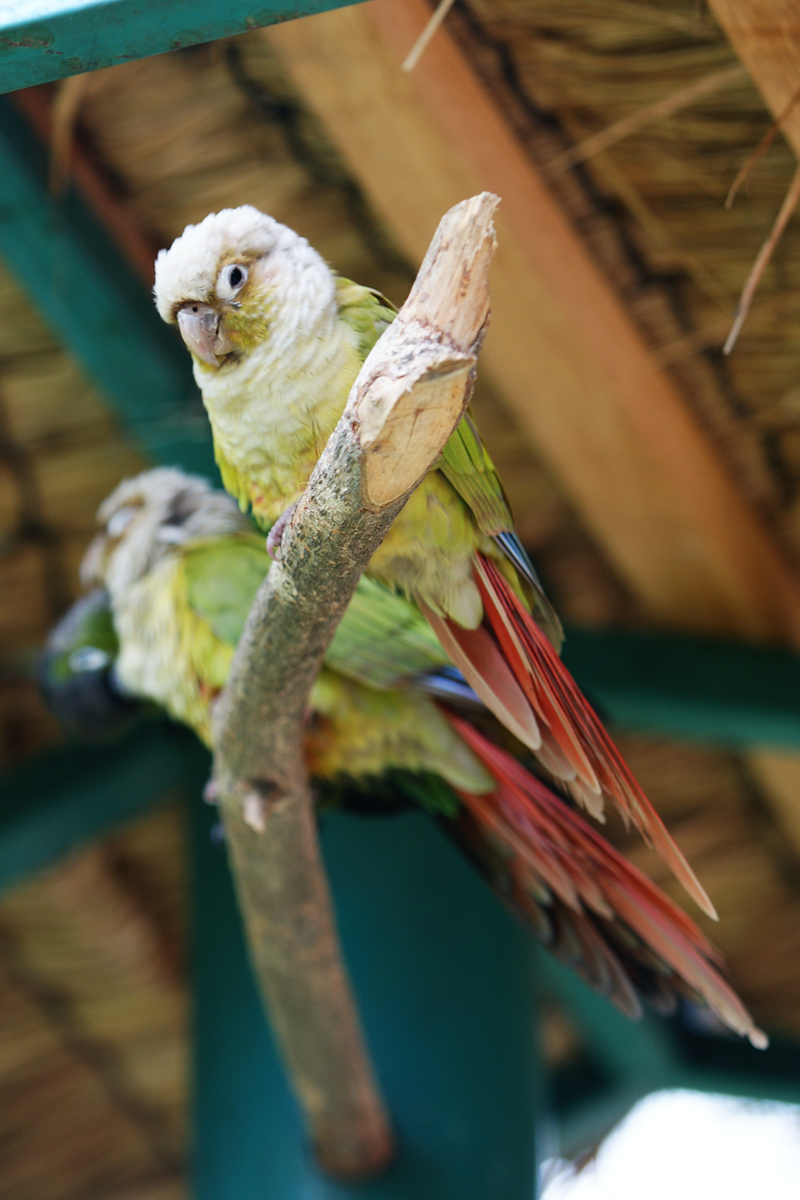
Cinnamon variety

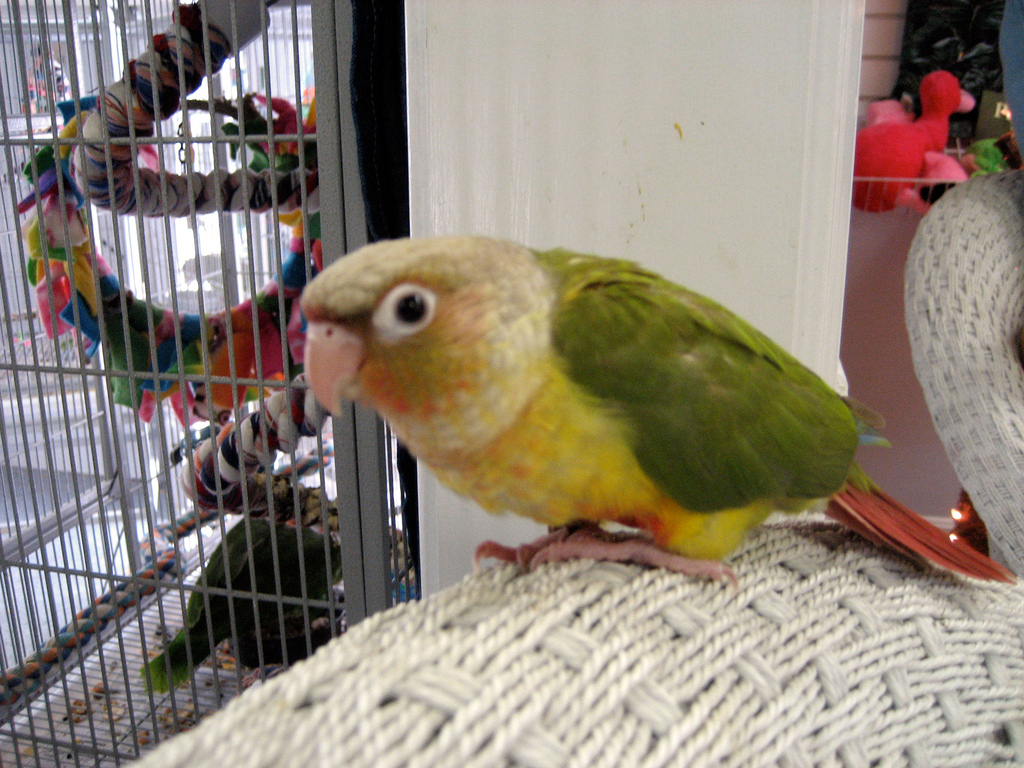
Pineapple variety (juvenile)

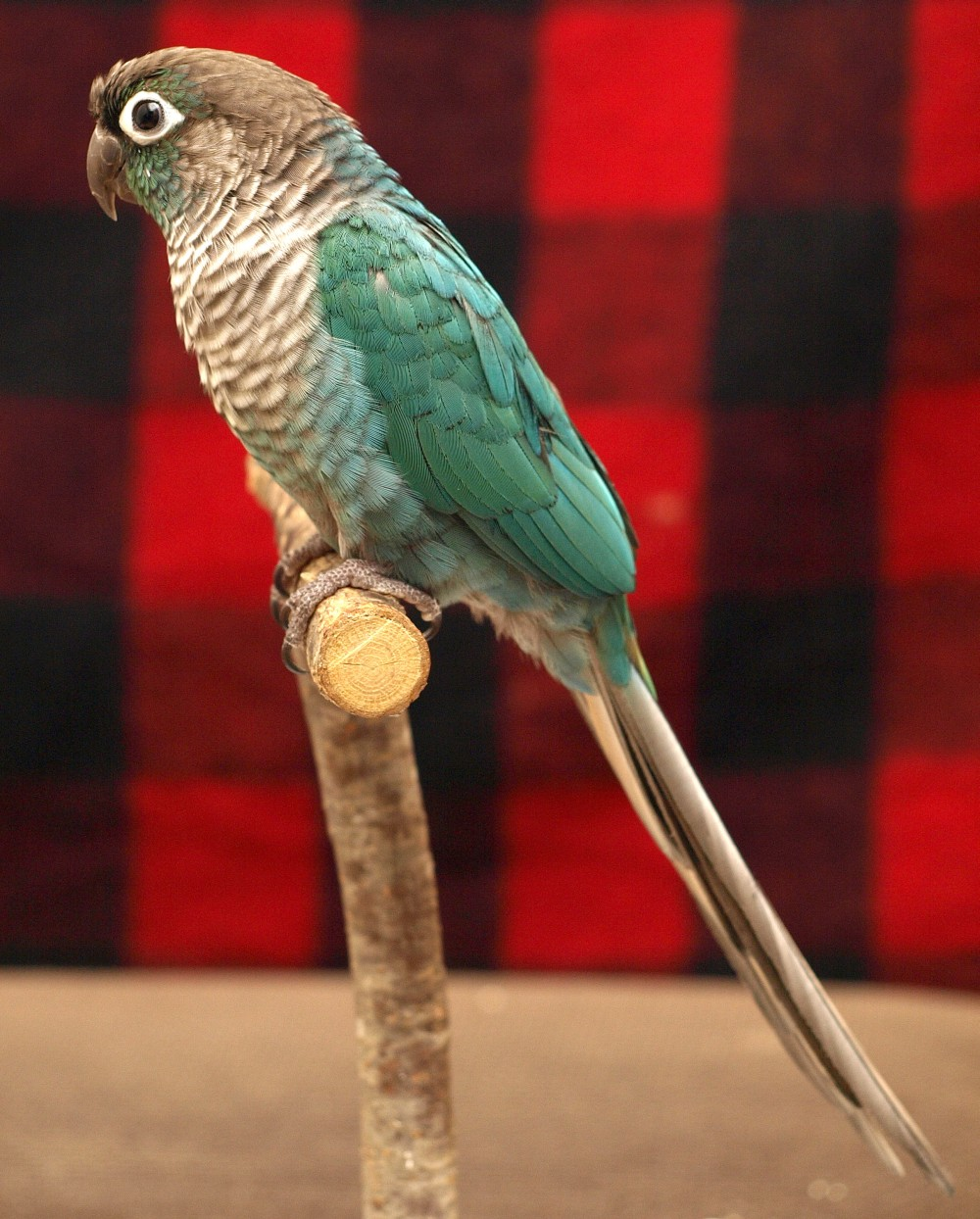
Turquoise variety (wing-clipped adult)

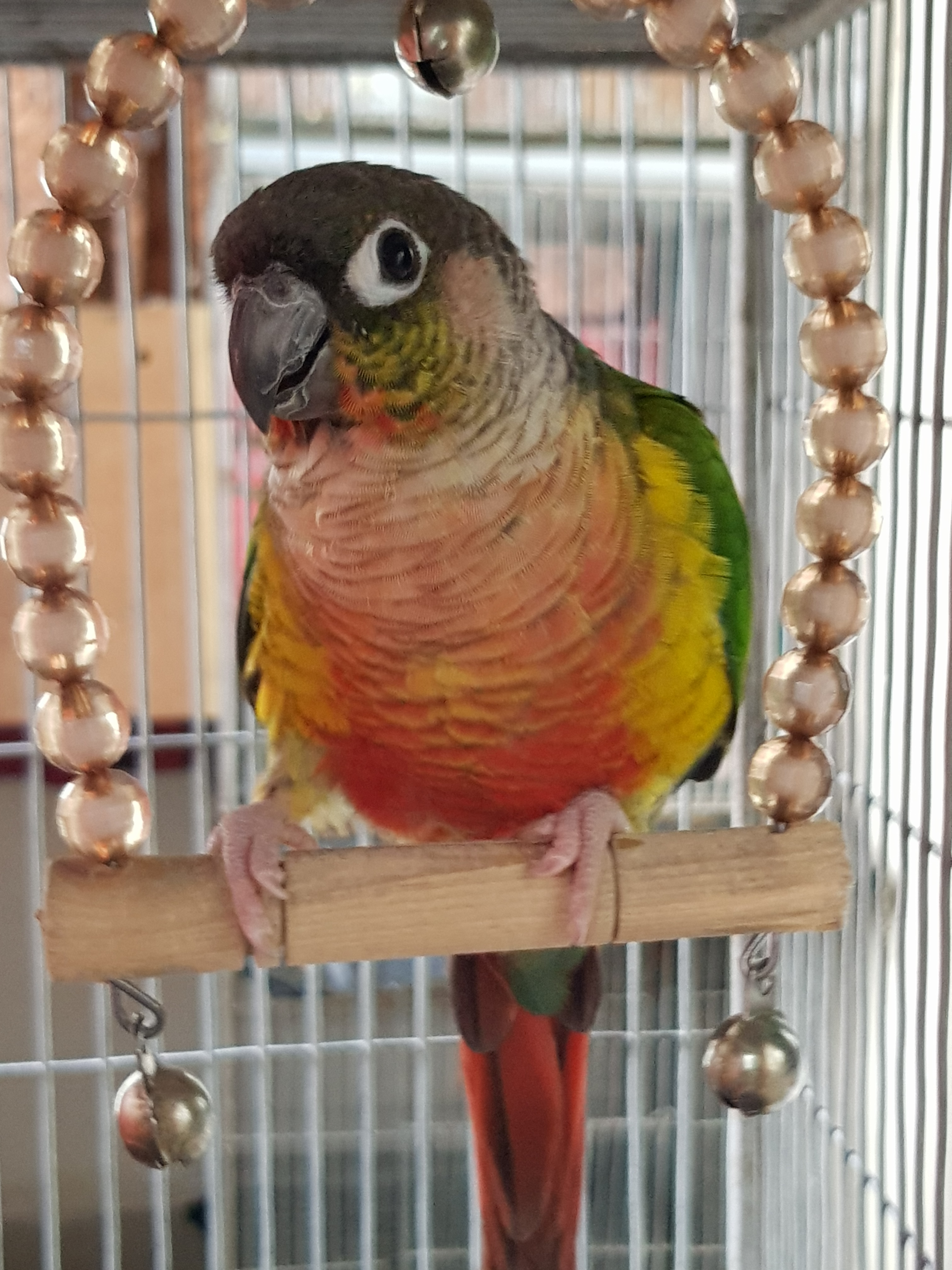
Yellow-sided green-cheek variety

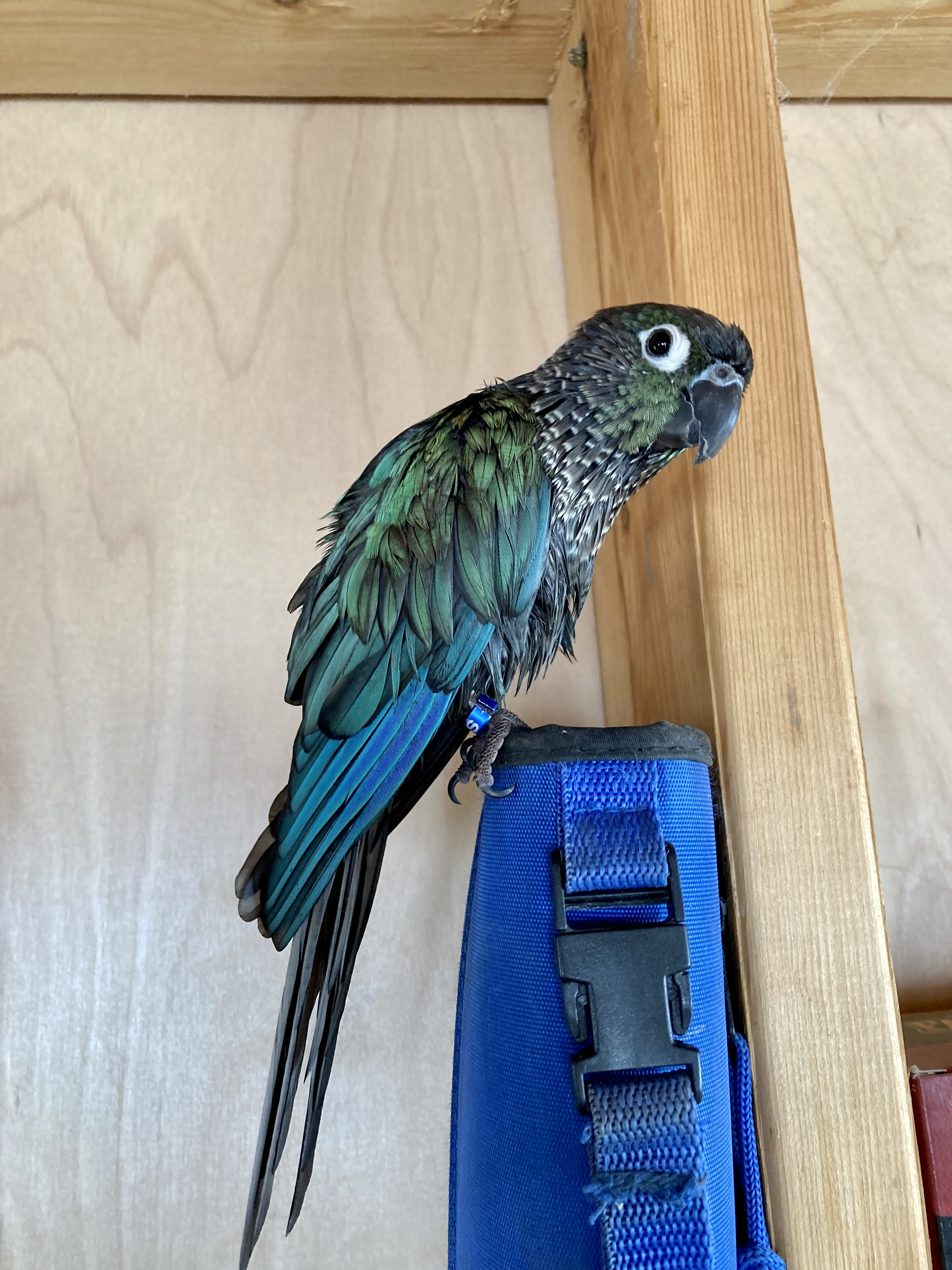
Turquoise variety (unclipped) after a bath

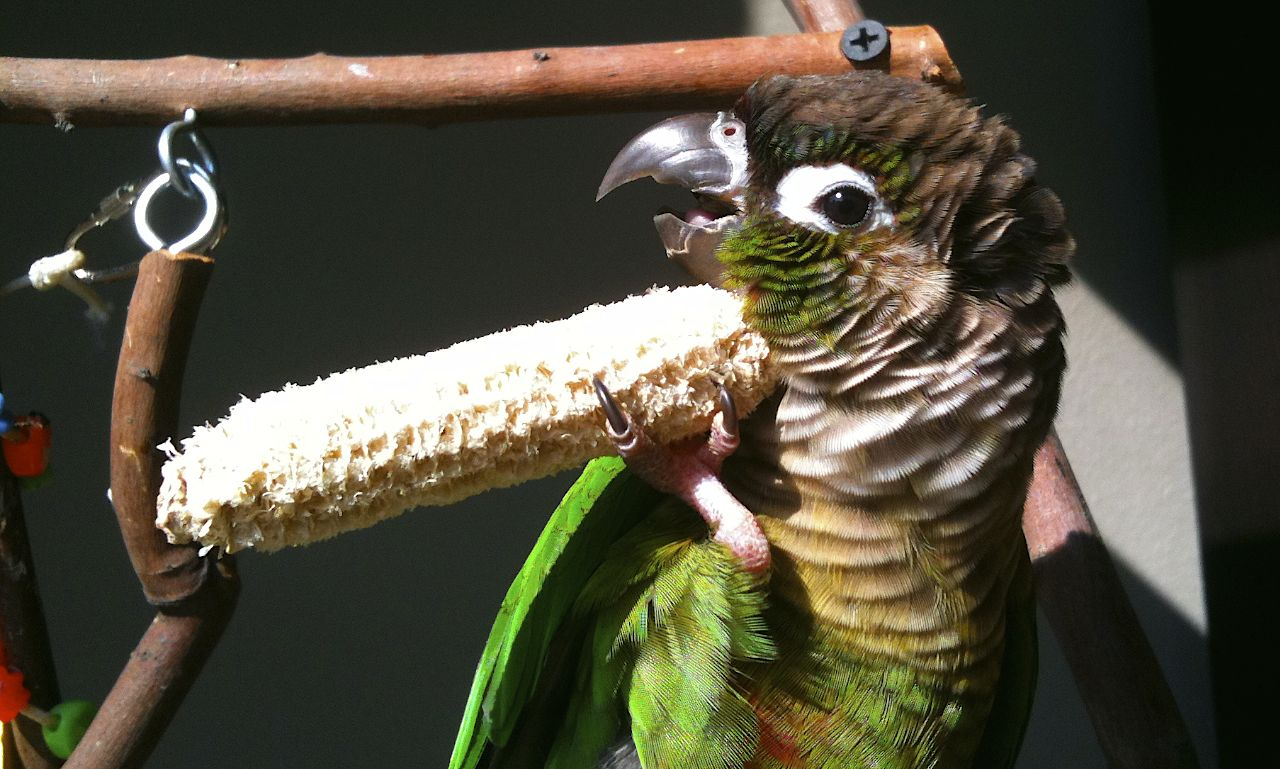
Scratching the neck with a corn cob, an example of tool use
