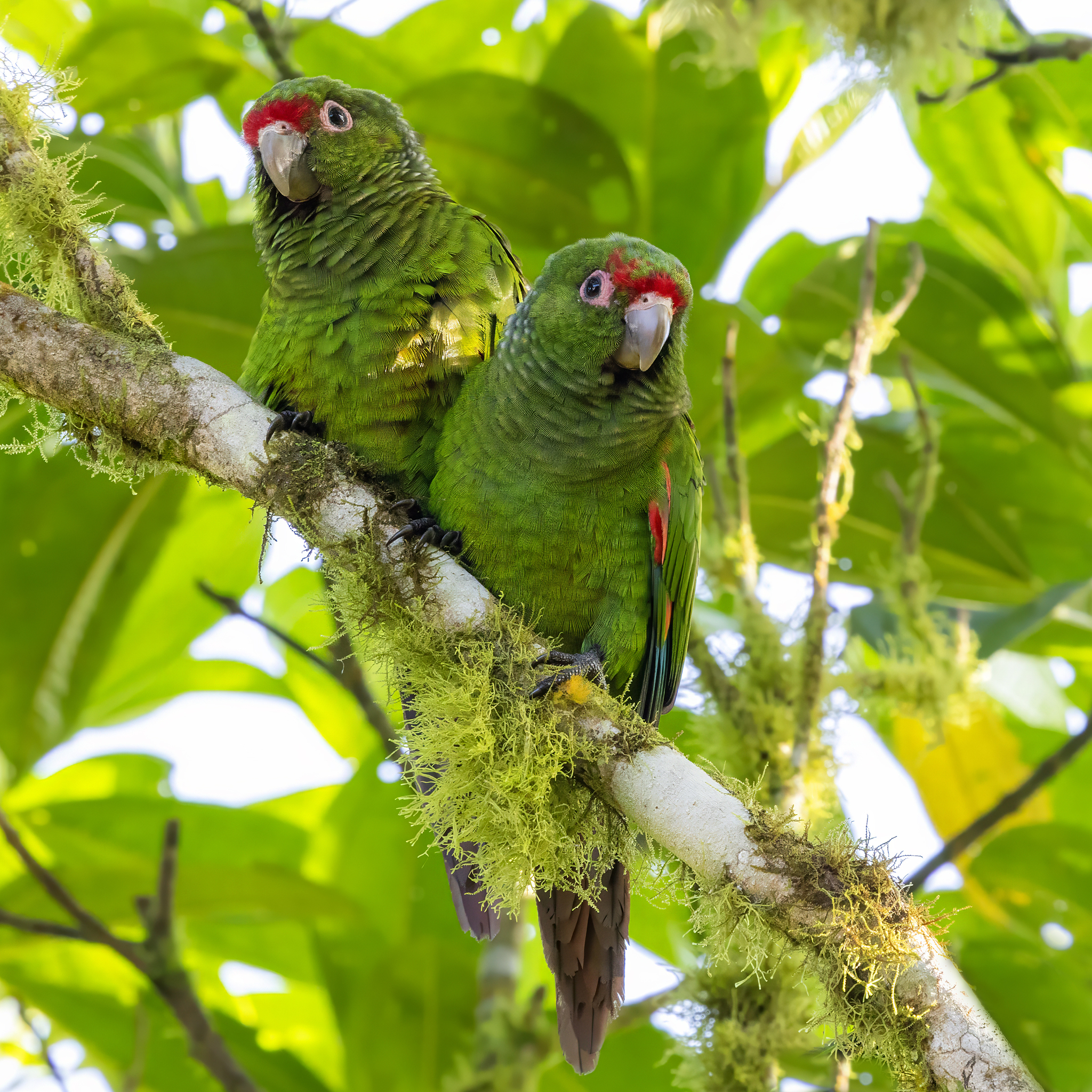

Conservation status
- Endangered (IUCN 3.1)
- CITES Appendix II

Scientific classification
- Kingdom: Animalia
- Phylum: Chordata
- Class: Aves
- Order: Psittaciformes
- Family: Psittacidae
- Genus: Pyrrhura
- Species: P. orcesi

Binomial name
- Pyrrhura orcesi Ridgely & Robbins, 1988

= El Oro parakeet =

Species of parrot

The El Oro parakeet (Pyrrhura orcesi) is an Endangered species of bird in subfamily Arinae of the family Psittacidae, the African and New World parrots. It is endemic to Ecuador.

== Taxonomy and systematics ==
The El Oro parakeet is monotypic. Its closest relative is believed to be the maroon-tailed parakeet (P. melanura).

== Description ==
The El Oro parakeet is 22 to 24 cm (8.7 to 9.4 in) long and weighs 65 to 75 g (2.3 to 2.6 oz). Adult males have a mostly green head with a red forehead and lores. Their upperparts are green. Their throat, the sides of their neck, and their breast are green with grayish buff bars giving an indistinct scaly appearance. The rest of their underparts are green with some faint dull reddish on the belly. Their wing is mostly green with red primary coverts; their primaries are blue. Their tail is maroon with a green base and a dusky maroon underside. Their bill is dusky and their iris is dark with bare pinkish skin surrounding it. Females are almost the same as males but with much reduced red on the forehead. Immature birds are similar to adults but with even less red on the head and wing and none on the belly.

== Distribution and habitat ==
The El Oro parakeet is found only on the west slope of the Ecuadoran Andes in Azuay and El Oro provinces. It is known only from an area of about 3,800 km^{2} (1,500 sq mi) that is 5 to 10 km (3 to 6 mi) wide and 100 km (60 mi) long. It inhabits humid subtropical and tropical forest mostly between 600 and 1,300 m (2,000 and 4,300 ft) of elevation but has been found as low as 300 m (1,000 ft) and as high as 1,800 m (5,900 ft).

== Behavior ==
=== Movement ===
The El Oro parakeet is not known to have any pattern of movements.

=== Feeding ===
The El Oro parakeet feeds on fruit and berries; some known sources are figs (Ficus), Heliocarpus, Hieronyma, and Cecropia. It typically forages in flocks of up to about 15 individuals but flocks as large as 60 have been observed.

=== Breeding ===
The El Oro parakeet's breeding season appears to span from March to July. It nests in natural tree cavities that have been noted as high as 24 m (80 ft) above the ground. It uses a variety of trees but Dacroide peruviana appears to be preferred. It also uses nest boxes provided by Buenaventura Reserve. El Oro parakeets breed cooperatively, a breeding pair being accompanied by up to six helpers.

=== Vocalization ===
The El Oro parakeet's most common call is "a series of grating notes with a rather hoarse quality, e.g. "crreeet crreeet crreeet" " that is given both from a perch and in flight. Perched birds also call with single "chuk" or "krrr" notes, though perched birds are often silent. Members of a flock "call frequently and simultaneously, producing a noisy chattering."

== Status ==
The IUCN originally assessed the El Oro parakeet as Vulneralble but since 2000 has listed it as Endangered. It has a very limited range and an estimated population of fewer than 1000 mature individuals. "Remaining habitat is fragmented, and both range and population are thought to be declining." The Buenaventura Reserve was created in 1999 by Fundación de Conservación Jocotoco to conserve this species and the El Oro tapaculo (Scytalopus robbinsi). It encompasses about 4,000 ha (15 sq mi) of cloudforest in which the Fundación maintains a network of nest boxes. About 75% of the El Oro parakeet's population is found there and nearby.
