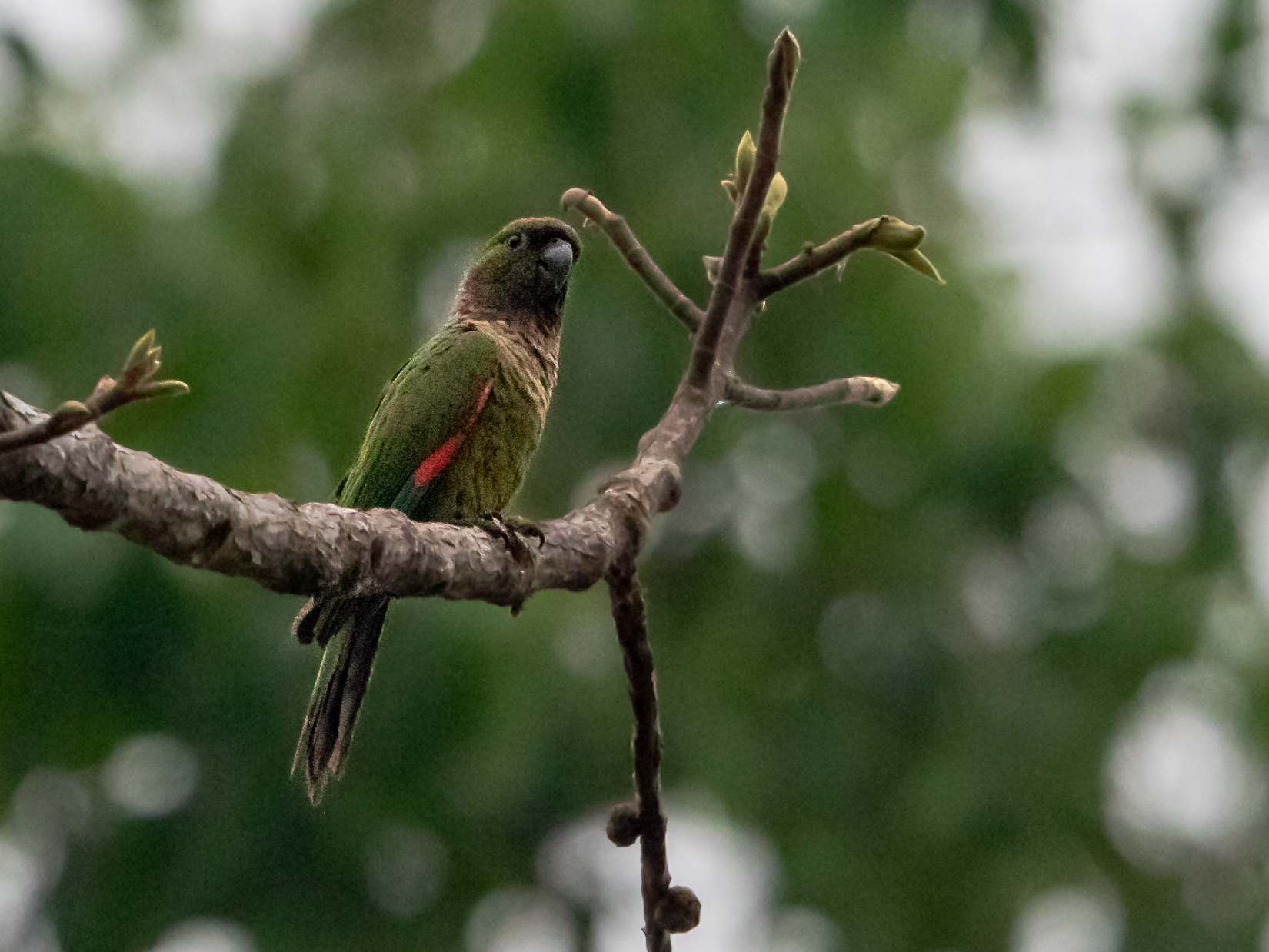

Conservation status
- Least Concern (IUCN 3.1)

Scientific classification
- Kingdom: Animalia
- Phylum: Chordata
- Class: Aves
- Order: Psittaciformes
- Family: Psittacidae
- Genus: Pyrrhura
- Species: P. rupicola

Binomial name
- Pyrrhura rupicola (Tschudi, 1844)

= Black-capped parakeet =

Species of bird

The black-capped parakeet (Pyrrhura rupicola), also known as the black-capped conure or rock conure in aviculture, is a parrot native to the south-western Amazon Basin and adjacent east Andean slopes in Peru, Bolivia and Brazil. It has a total length of approximately 25 cm. It is mostly green with off white scalloping on the hindneck and breast and red primary coverts.

It lives in humid forests, ranging from the Amazonian lowlands up to an altitude of 1000 m on the east Andean slopes. It is designated as Least Concern despite deforestation in the Amazon Basin. Flock size is up to 30 birds with smaller groups forming during breeding season.

In aviculture, these birds are known as black capped conures. They can reproduce in captivity and can also mate with the green cheeked parakeet to produce hybrid offspring.

== Taxonomy ==
Swiss naturalist Johann Jakob von Tschudi described the species in 1844.

There are two subspecies of Pyrrhura rupicola:

- P. r. rupicola
- P. r. sandiae

P. r. rupicola can be found in western South America and is common in Peru. P. r. sandiae can be found in the extreme west of Brazil, south-east Peru, and northern Bolivia. Commonly called the Sandia conure in aviculture, it features narrower scalloped feathers on the neck and breast and a lack of scalloped feathers on the hindneck.

The black capped parakeet may breed with the green cheeked parakeet in the wild.

"Black-capped parakeet" has been designated the official name by the International Ornithologists' Union (IOC). It is also known in the pet trade as black-capped conure or rock conure.

== Behavior ==
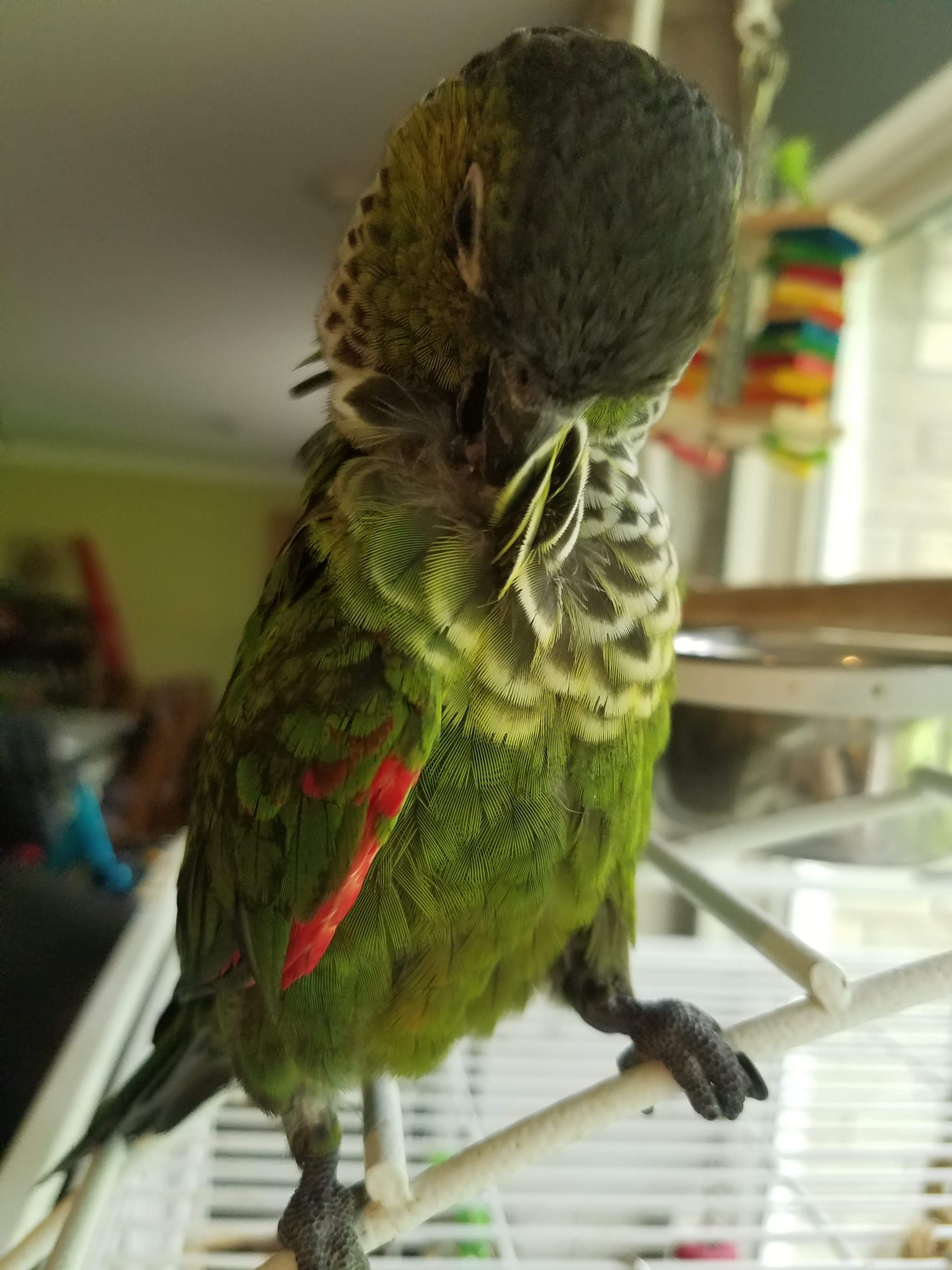
Black capped parakeet grooming breast feathers

Black capped parakeets are highly social birds and communal roosters. In the wild, they flock with up to 30 birds at a time. During breeding season smaller groups of families can be found. Black capped parakeets enjoy bathing. In the wild black capped parakeets are canopy feeders. The black capped parakeet lives up to 30 years in captivity.

=== Breeding ===
Black capped parakeets reach sexual maturity between 1 and 3 years old. They roost in small groups during breeding season. A clutch generally has 4 to 7 eggs. They have a 24-day incubation period, followed by 7 to 8 weeks of parental care. Black capped parakeets have a breeding season from February to March.

=== Diet ===
Wild black capped parakeets eat a variety of fruits, nuts, berries, and vegetation. They may also raid farmers crops. Additionally, black capped parakeets have also been noted to subsist off a diet partially consisting off nectar and insects when other food sources are difficult to obtain.

=== Conservation ===
Black capped parakeets are listed as near-threatened in the wild on Appendix II. The primary cause of their habitat loss is the deforestation of the Amazon Basin. It is estimated that there will be a 13.7% to 15.5% loss of habitable land over 18 years. A decrease in forest buffers alongside streams, amnesty for land owners guilty of illegal deforestation before 2008, and a reduction in the amount of private land that must be kept as forest contribute to this problem.

== Aviculture ==
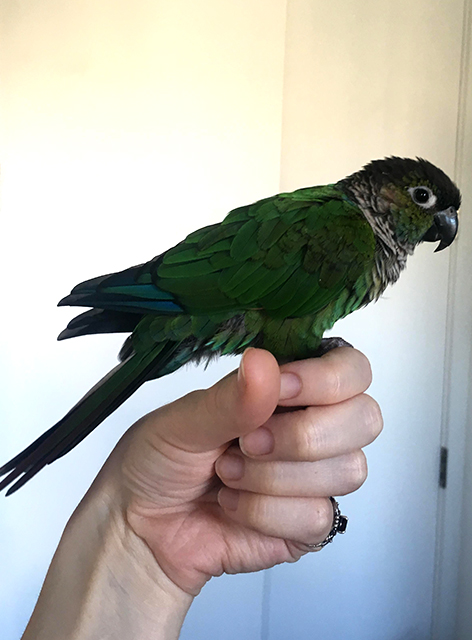
A green-cheeked/black-capped parakeet hybrid.

Known as the black capped conure in aviculture, it is known as the quietest of the conures. If they are bored or left alone for too long they can be loud. They are most active at dawn and dusk. They are sociable birds who require a lot of attention. They may be shy around new people, but their highly inquisitive nature often negates any shyness. To clean themselves and keep their feathers orderly black capped conures preen themselves. They may yawn after this to clear out their nasal passages. Conures often enjoy having their head scratched gently by their owners. They may indicate this by bowing their heads or rubbing against a hand.

=== Behavior in aviculture ===
As highly inquisitive birds, black capped conures require many versatile toys to keep them occupied. Many toys should be obtained and they should be rotated out every few days. Interactive toys such as bird puzzles can entertain a conure and prevent boredom. Black capped conures have an affinity for water and enjoy bathing and dunking their dry food in water. Their water bowl should be changed at least twice a day for this reason. After bathing, black capped conures shiver to build and maintain body heat.

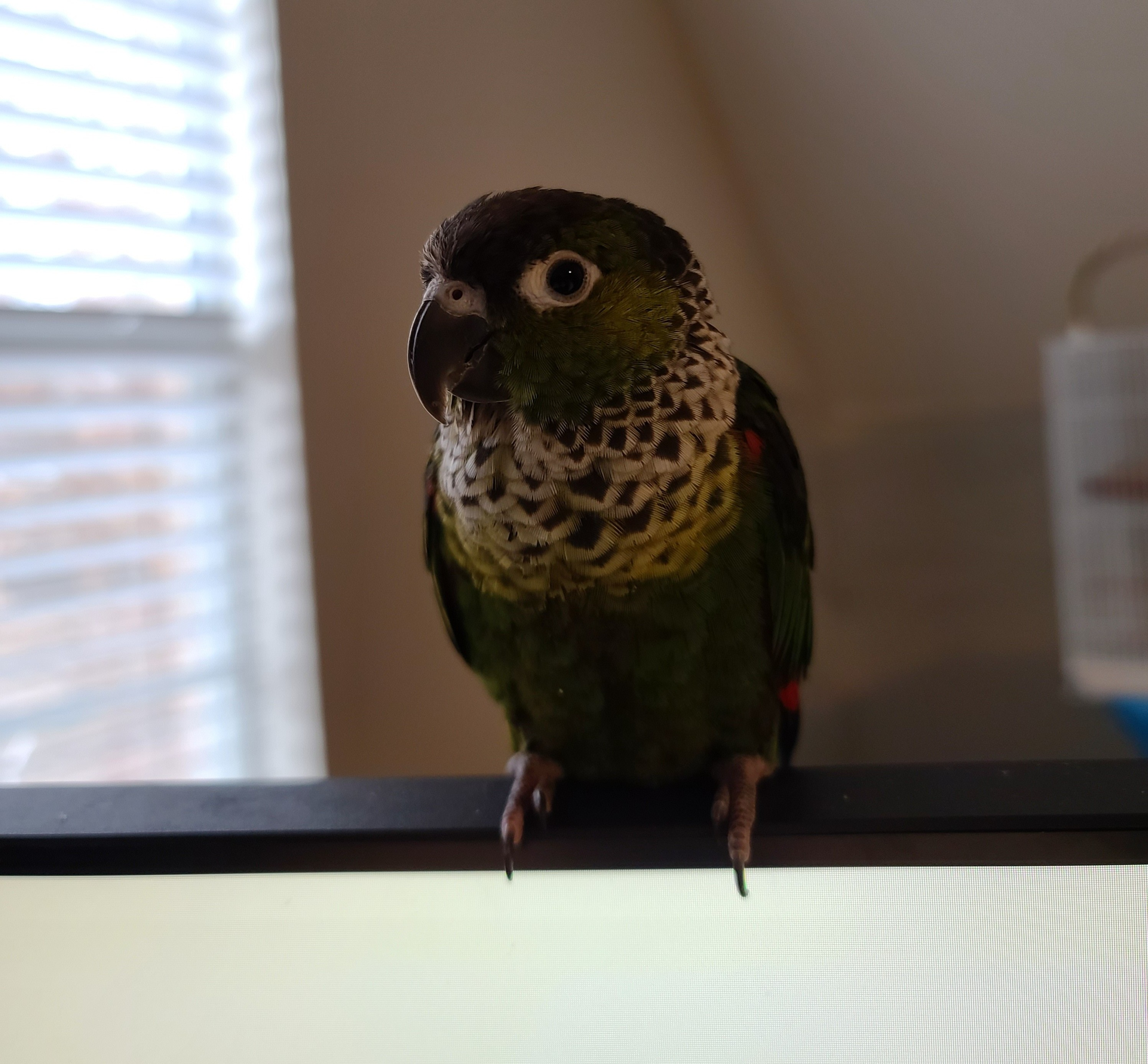
Black capped parakeet perched on top of computer monitor

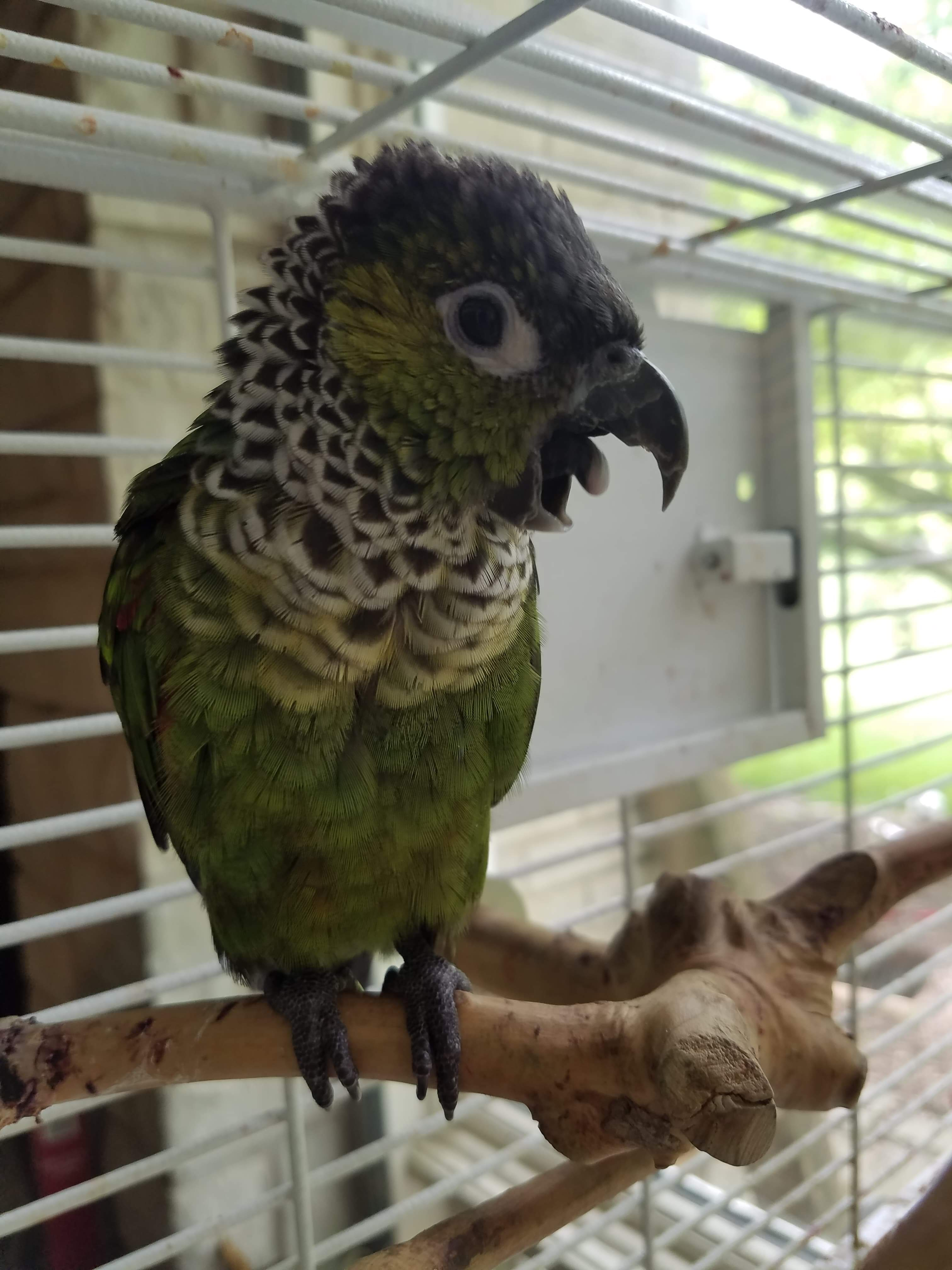
Black capped parakeet yawning while standing on natural wood perch

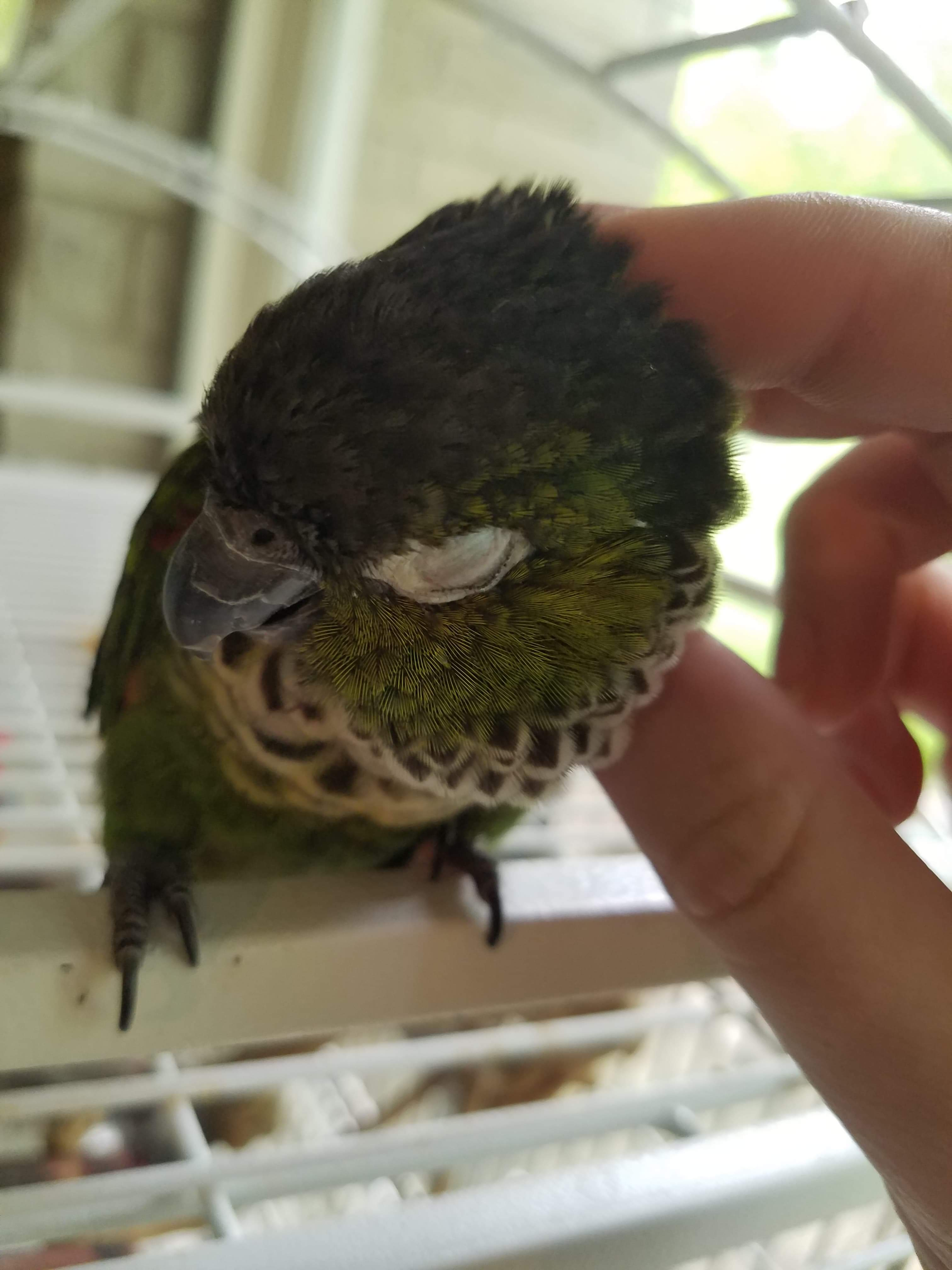
Black capped parakeet leaning in to receive scritches from owner

==== Diet ====
A black-capped conure should be fed a healthy mix of fruits, vegetables, and pellets. The pellets should account for about 75% of the bird's diet, while 25% of their diet should be fresh fruit and vegetables. Seeds, nuts, and other treats high in fat should be used as a reward and to supplement the diet. Black-capped conures should be given a wide variety of colorful fruits and vegetables. Light green or white vegetables have little nutritional value. Conures can eat human food, although they cannot eat avocados, chocolate, alcohol, or caffeine. They can eat small amounts of meat and eggs, although they should avoid foods high in fat and salt.

==== Biting ====
Wild conures do not bite regularly. Birds have a non-verbal language that humans often do not understand, resulting in a bite. Conures may also bite to elicit a strong response from the owners. If the response to biting is to place the conure in their cage, they may begin to bite when they want to return to their cage, or they may begin to dislike their cage and associate it with punishment. The best solutions to unwarranted biting are standing your ground with a firm "no" or ignoring the bird and leaving the room.

==== Feather plucking ====
Feather plucking may occur if a black capped conure is bored. This is a harmful habit that should be stopped quickly. To stop plucking change or add interactive toys to the cage and increase the amount of time the bird is out.

=== Breeding ===
Although black capped conures are not the most prolific breeders, they can be bred in captivity. They start breeding around 18 months old, although the exact time varies for each bird. The females should be introduced to their nesting cage first, and given time to acclimate to the change before introducing the males. Pairings should take place at the end of December. There are rarely problems with mate acceptance. Eggs are laid in February, and hatching occurs 23 days later in March. Nest boxes should be left alone unless the parents are not taking care of their young. This can be determined by listening to the babies' cries: interrupted cries that eventually stop indicate the babies are being fed. The babies are ready to leave the parents at around eight or nine weeks.
