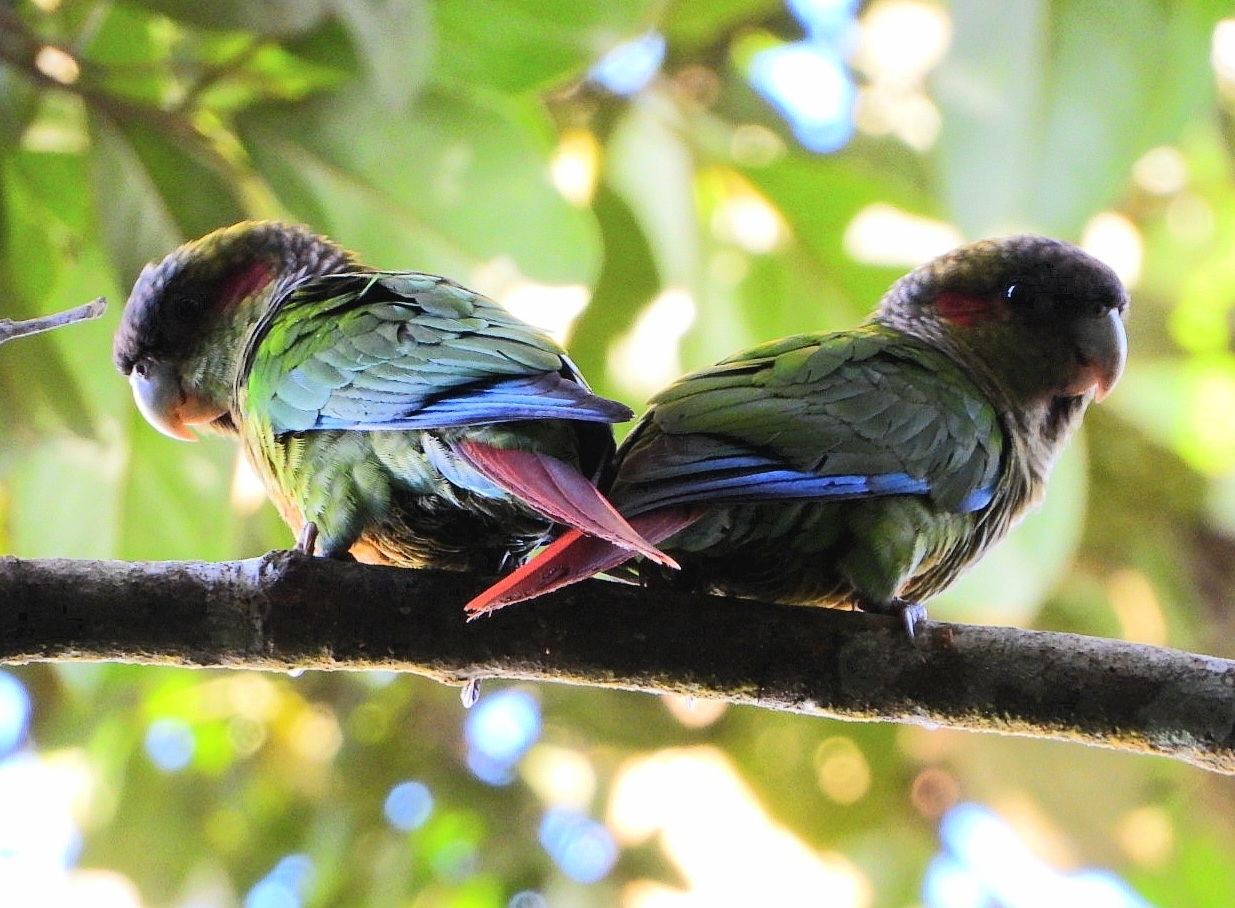

Conservation status
- Near Threatened (IUCN 3.1)
- CITES Appendix II

Scientific classification
- Kingdom: Animalia
- Phylum: Chordata
- Class: Aves
- Order: Psittaciformes
- Family: Psittacidae
- Genus: Pyrrhura
- Species: P. hoematotis

Binomial name
- Pyrrhura hoematotis Souancé, 1857

= Blood-eared parakeet =

Species of bird

The blood-eared parakeet (Pyrrhura hoematotis), also known as the red-eared parakeet and in aviculture as the red-eared conure, is a species of bird in subfamily Arinae of the family Psittacidae, the African and New World parrots. It is endemic to Venezuela.

== Taxonomy and systematics ==
The blood-eared parakeet has two subspecies, the nominate P. h. hoematotis (Souancé, 1857) and P. h. immarginata (Zimmer & W.H. Phelps, 1944).

== Description ==
The blood-eared parakeet is about 25 cm (9.8 in) long and weighs 64 to 74 g (2.3 to 2.6 oz). The sexes are the same. Adults of the nominate subspecies are slaty gray from forehead to mid-crown, with bare white skin around the eye and bright terracotta ear coverts that give it its English name. Their nape feathers are green with yellow edges and the rest of their upperparts are green. Their throat, the sides of their neck, and their upper breast are yellow-green with grayish feather edges giving a scaly appearance. The rest of their underparts are green with some reddish brown on the belly and bluish green undertail coverts. Their wing is mostly green with blue primaries. Their tail's upperside is brownish red with green feather tips; its underside is coppery. Subspecies P. h. immarginata has a green crown and nape and reduced scaling on the sides of the neck.

== Distribution and habitat ==
The nominate subspecies of the blood-eared parakeet is found in the Venezuelan Coastal Range between the states of Aragua and Miranda. P. h. immarginata is found in the Andes of southeastern Lara state. The species inhabits the interior and edges of cloudforest and secondary forest, wooded savanna, and clearings with scattered trees. In elevation it mostly occurs between 1,000 and 2,000 m (3,300 and 6,600 ft).

== Behavior ==
=== Movement ===
In the dry season some blood-eared parakeets move into lower elevation semi-deciduous forest.

=== Feeding ===
The blood-eared parakeet typically forages in small flocks in the forest canopy. Its diet includes fruits, seeds, flowers, and possibly insect larvae.

=== Breeding ===
The blood-eared parakeet nests in the wet season centering in August; nothing else is known about its breeding biology.

=== Vocalization ===
The blood-eared parakeet's most common call is "a series of harsh notes, e.g. "krree krree krree" " that is given both from a perch and in flight. Perched birds also call with single "kurree", "kurruk", or "krreekuk" notes, though perched birds are often silent. Flocks in flight "call frequently and simultaneously, producing a noisy, harsh chattering."

== Status ==
The IUCN has assessed the blood-eared parakeet as being Near Threatened, due to its small range and persistent population losses as a result of habitat degradation. It occurs in several well-protected areas. However, "due to its small range and apparently declining population, this species may be of conservation concern; population estimates are urgently needed."
