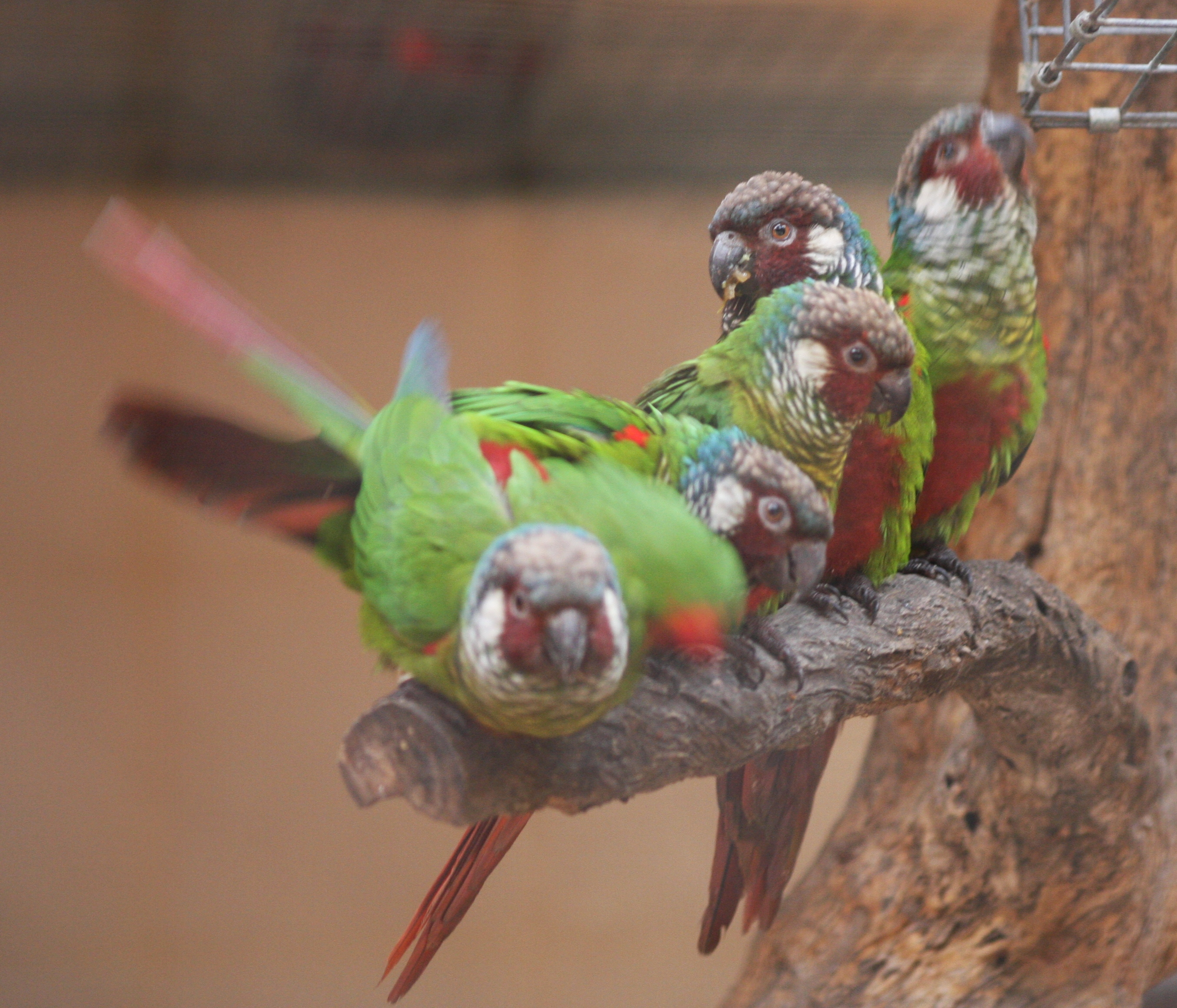
- At Palmitos Park, Gran Canaria, Spain

Conservation status
- Vulnerable (IUCN 3.1)
- CITES Appendix II (CITES)

Scientific classification
- Kingdom: Animalia
- Phylum: Chordata
- Class: Aves
- Order: Psittaciformes
- Family: Psittacidae
- Genus: Pyrrhura
- Species: P. leucotis

Binomial name
- Pyrrhura leucotis (Kuhl, 1820)

= White-eared parakeet =

Species of bird

The white-eared parakeet or maroon-faced parakeet (Pyrrhura leucotis) is a Vulnerable species of bird in subfamily Arinae of the family Psittacidae, the African and New World parrots. It is endemic to Brazil.

== Taxonomy and systematics ==
The white-eared parakeet is monotypic. However, what are now the Venezuelan parakeet (P. emma), the grey-breasted parakeet (P. griseipectus), and Pfrimer's parakeet (P. pfrimeri) were all at one time treated as subspecies of it.

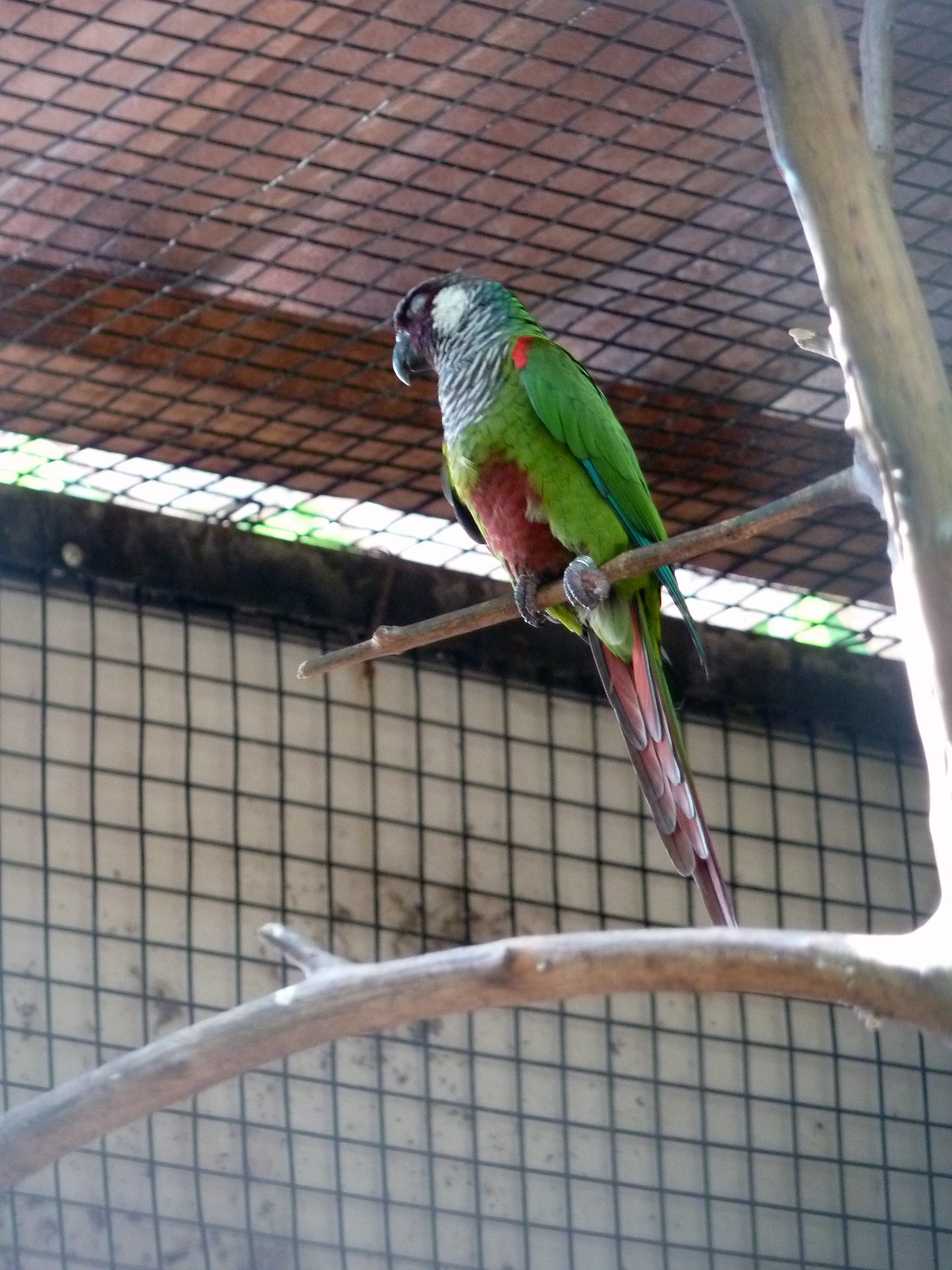
At Parque das Aves, Foz do Iguaçu, Brazil

== Description ==
The white-eared parakeet is 23 to 25 cm (9.1 to 9.8 in) long. The sexes are the same. Adults have a light brown crown, a bluish forehead and hindneck, a maroon face, and whitish ear coverts. Their upperparts are mostly green with a reddish rump. Their chin, throat, and the sides of their neck are green with light buff scaling. The center of their belly is brownish red and the rest of their underparts are green. Their wing is mostly green with a red shoulder and blue flight feathers. Their tail is brownish red with a duller underside. Immatures are similar to adults.

== Distribution and habitat ==
The white-eared parakeet is found in eastern Brazil where it occurs from Bahia south to Rio de Janeiro state. It inhabits the interior and edges of tropical evergreen forest, clearings with scattered trees, and also shaded cacao plantations. In elevation it ranges from sea level to about 600 m (2,000 ft).

== Behavior ==
=== Movement ===
The white-eared parakeet is mostly sedentary but is thought to make some dispersive movements.

=== Feeding ===
The white-eared parakeet feeds primarily on seeds and fruits but also includes berries, nuts, and possibly insects and flowers in its diet.

=== Breeding ===
Nothing is known about the white-eared parakeet's breeding biology in the wild. In captivity it lays a clutch of five to nine eggs; the female alone incubates for 27 days and fledging occurs about five weeks after hatch.

=== Vocalization ===
The white-eared parakeet's call is a "very high, rather thin, rapid 'wee-wee-wee- -' or 'tic-tic-tic- -'."

== Status ==
The IUCN originally assessed the white-eared parakeet as Near Threatened and since 2017 as Vulnerable. It has a limited range. Its estimated population of between 2500 and 10,000 mature individuals occurs in small subpopulations and is believed to be decreasing. Most of its original Atlantic Forest habitat was cleared long ago and what remains is under threat. Most of the subpopulations occur in national parks and other preserves but some of them are undergoing illegal forest clearing. There also appears to be a significant number captured for the pet trade despite nominal legal protection.
