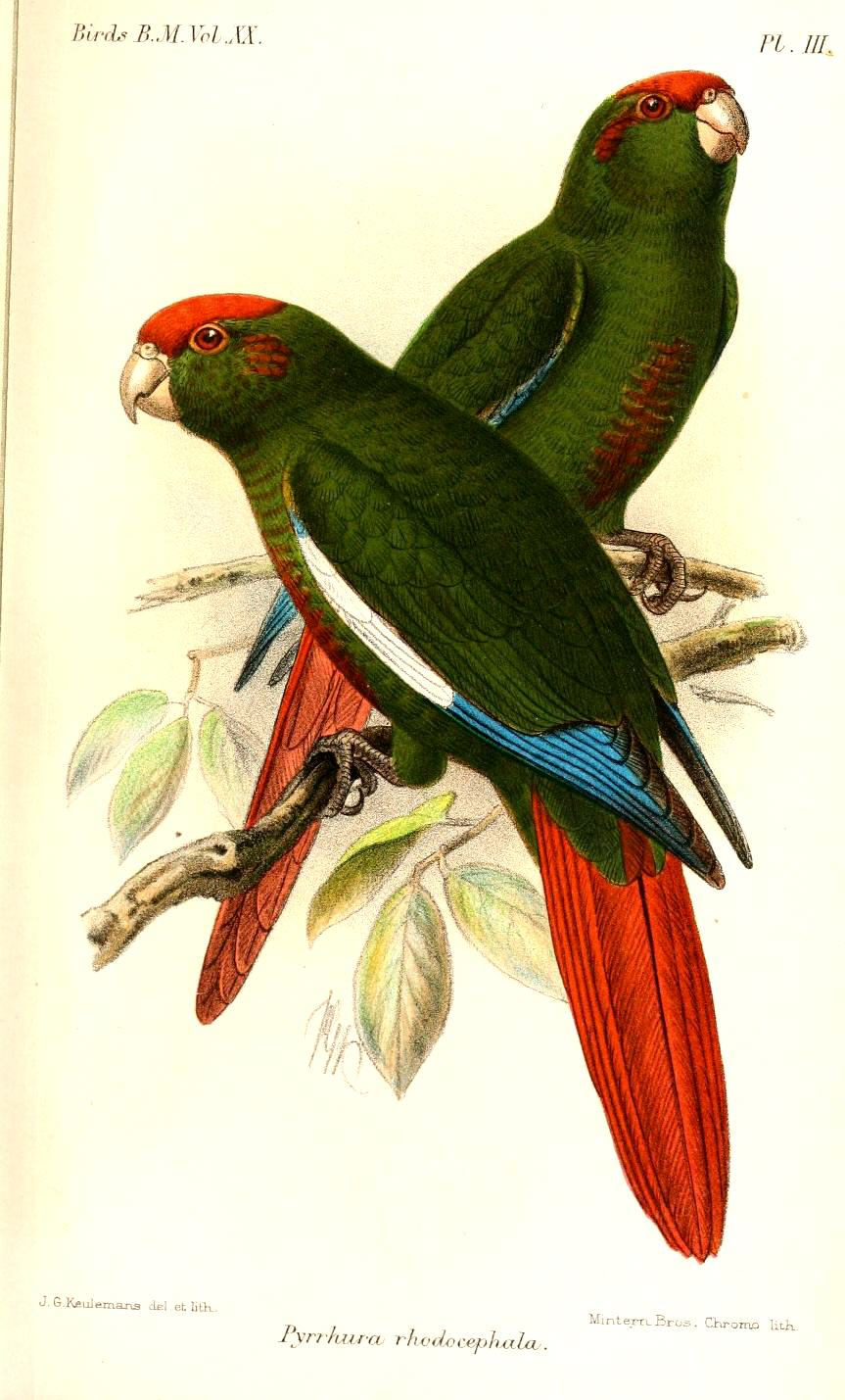

Conservation status
- Least Concern (IUCN 3.1)

Scientific classification
- Kingdom: Animalia
- Phylum: Chordata
- Class: Aves
- Order: Psittaciformes
- Family: Psittacidae
- Genus: Pyrrhura
- Species: P. rhodocephala

Binomial name
- Pyrrhura rhodocephala (Sclater, PL & Salvin, 1871)

= Rose-crowned parakeet =

Species of bird

The rose-crowned parakeet (Pyrrhura rhodocephala), also known as the rose-headed parakeet, rose-crowned conure or rose-headed conure (perico cabeza roja or cotorra coronirroja in Spanish and conure tête-de-feu in French), is a species of parrot in the family Psittacidae and genus Pyrrhura. It is endemic to Venezuela.

== Taxonomy ==
The rose-crowned parakeet was first described by Philip Sclater and Osbert Salvin in 1871.

== Description ==
The rose-crowned parakeet is a small parrot, measuring 24 cm long with a wing length of 13 to 14.2 cm, tail 9.7 to 11.5 cm, and bill 1.6 to 1.8 cm long, with a tarsus length of 1.4 to 1.6 cm. As an adult it is mainly green; its bright red cap and white primary coverts (blue in juveniles) help to distinguish it from all other long-tailed, small parrot species in South America. It has blue primaries and a red tail and the sexes are alike. No other members of the genus Pyrrhura occur in its range. The painted parakeet also has red on its head but has bold, scaly patterns on its breast and throat. The bare skin around the eye is white.

== Distribution and habitat ==
It is endemic to Venezuela, found only in the Andes of the north-west in the Cordillera de Mérida, from Táchira to Trujillo. Its natural habitats are subtropical or tropical moist montane forests and heavily degraded former forest, at elevations of 800 m to 3,100 m asl, but mostly at 1,500–2,500 m. It can also be found in farmland with scattered trees and at the forest edge.

Its estimated extent of occurrence is 17,000 km^{2}. In 1988 it was assessed for the IUCN Red List as Near Threatened, updated to Lower Risk in 2000 and Least Concern since 2004; in 2002 it was described as "fairly common." A reported population decline caused by deforestation had not become problematic as of 2010, but Parr and Juniper considered that in a species with such a small range this must present a long-term threat. The current population trend is "stable" although the number of mature individuals is unknown. The rose-crowned parakeet is on the CITES Appendix II which "includes species not necessarily threatened with extinction, but in which trade must be controlled in order to avoid utilization incompatible with their survival."

== Behavior ==
The rose-crowned parakeet is gregarious, forming noisy flocks of 10–30 birds when not breeding, and gathers in larger numbers to roost. It makes movements each day, but the species is probably resident. The voice is described as "harsh [and] reedy", though "apparently quieter than other Pyrrhura conures." The flight is "swift and direct." Nothing is known of the species' diet, though it is suspected to eat berries, seeds, fruits and flowers. It is thought to breed in April, May and June, probably laying 4–6 eggs.

== Aviculture ==
The World Parrot Trust describes the rose-crowned parakeet as "uncommon" in captivity, with a probable lifespan of 10–15 years. It is suggested that a suitable diet should include 30% fruit, along with vegetables, pellets and mixed small seeds. Captive birds lay 4–6 eggs which hatch after 23–24 days, with the chicks fledging at "probably 7–8 weeks."
