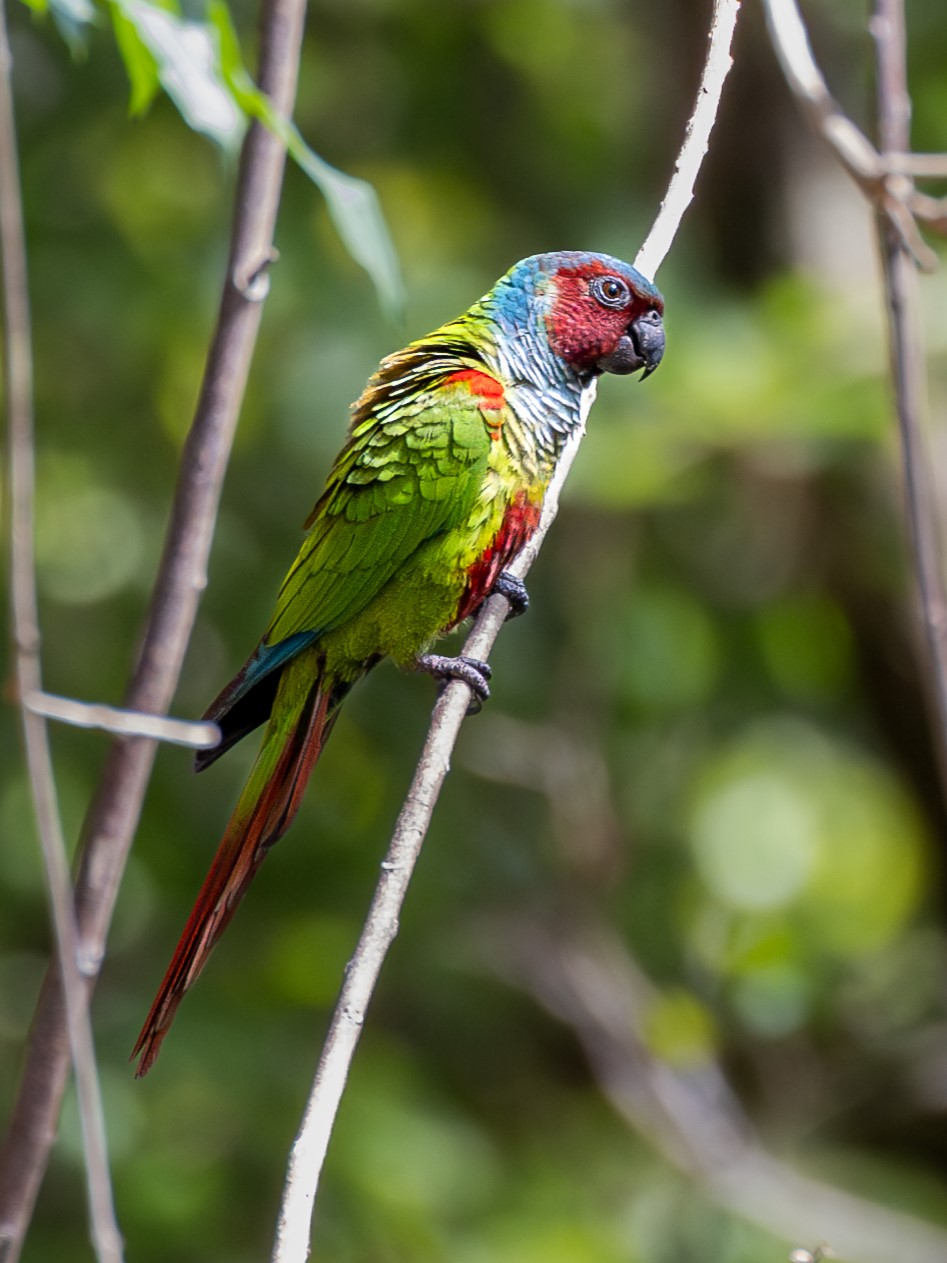
- P. pfrimeri in Brazil

Conservation status
- Endangered (IUCN 3.1)

Scientific classification
- Domain: Eukaryota
- Kingdom: Animalia
- Phylum: Chordata
- Class: Aves
- Order: Psittaciformes
- Family: Psittacidae
- Genus: Pyrrhura
- Species: P. pfrimeri

Binomial name
- Pyrrhura pfrimeri Miranda-Ribeiro, 1920

Synonyms
- Pyrrhura leucotis pfrimeri

= Pfrimer's parakeet =

Species of bird

Pfrimer's parakeet (Pyrrhura pfrimeri) is a non-migratory species within the parrot family Psittacidae. It also is known as Pfrimer's conure, Goias parakeet, and maroon-faced conure. The Pfrimer's parakeet has been qualified as endangered by the IUCN and BirdLife International since 2007. It is endemic to the Goiás and Tocantins regions of Brazil. It is mainly found within a belt of dry deciduous and semi-deciduous areas of the Caatinga forest.

It was considered a subspecies of the white-eared parakeet, as Pyrrhura leucotis pfrimeri. The split was based on range, differences in habitat and distinctive differences in plumage (it is the only member of the P. leucotis complex where the pale patch on the ear-coverts is greatly reduced). A recent study based on mtDNA has confirmed its status as a distinct species.

The population of Pfrimer's parakeet is currently decreasing, with a current population of between 20,000 and 49,000 individuals. The main factor behind the decreasing population is deforestation for agriculture.

Individuals have an average lifespan of 6–8 years.

== Morphology ==
Adult and juvenile Pfrimer's parakeet look similar in plumage. They have brown and red faces and ear coverts, with a blue crown. They have white or grey eye rings surround their brown or orange eyes above their gray or black beaks. Their necks are covered in green or blue feathers. The breasts are colored blue or green with hints of white and brown, while their abdomen is brown/red. The wings have a blend of red, green, and blue. Their tails are typically seen to be maroon with a green base.

Adult Pfrimer's parakeets grow up to a size of around 22–23 cm (8.5–9 ins) including the tail.

== Range ==
Pfrimer's parakeet is endemic to Caatinga forest of the Goiás and Tocantins states of Brazil. These birds are known to be found up to 600 m up in deciduous or semi-deciduous forests. According to the BirdLife International and the IUCN they have an estimated extent of occurrence up to 20,300 km^{2}. The range of this bird is severely fragmented due to habitat loss and ecosystem degradation. This is partly why BirdLife International has listed this species as Endangered.

== Ecology ==
=== Behavior ===
These social birds can usually be found in flocks that can consist of up to 10 birds. These flocks are typically noisy when in flight but will be quiet when resting or feeding in the canopy.

=== Breeding ===
The breeding season for is thought to start in April and continue until June. Adult Pfrimer's parakeets typically have around 3–8 eggs per nest.

=== Diet ===
The diet of Pfrimer's parakeet is mostly made up of fruits, berries, and seeds; though they have been known to eat certain flowers, insects, and their larvae.

== Conservation ==
=== Threats ===
Currently the Pfrimer's parakeet is Endangered. Since they only live within a small area human activities affecting their habitat are devastating. Currently there are anywhere from 20,000 to 49,000 individuals living in Brazil. This number is decreasing as deforestation and habitat degradation increase within their range. Anthropogenic activities, such as agriculture, mining, and hunting are reasons as to why the population is currently decreasing. According to the IUCN there has been a 66% decrease in its natural habitat within the last 31 years due to deforestation. This deforestation is typically through selective logging, fires, and the conversation of forested land to meadows.

=== Use and trade ===
Pfrimer's parakeet is not threatened by trade of exotic species as much as other exotic species but is still captured for this purpose on occasion.

=== Conservation actions in place ===
Currently the only action in the conservation of this species is some protection of its native habitat. Other than this there are no major conservation plans in place are specifically for the Pfrimer's parakeet in place.

=== Conservation/research needed ===
More general research is needed for Pfrimer's parakeet. Little research has been done on this species and therefore reliable information and sources are uncommon. The IUCN currently has the largest source of data on the Pfrimer's parakeet, but other sources should as the Cornell Lab of Ornithology and BirdLife International are lacking in complete information. The habitat of Pfrimer's parakeet shrinks by 2.1% each year and is in dire need of conservation. Logging and agriculture interests are currently the main threats against this species, which it needs protection from.
