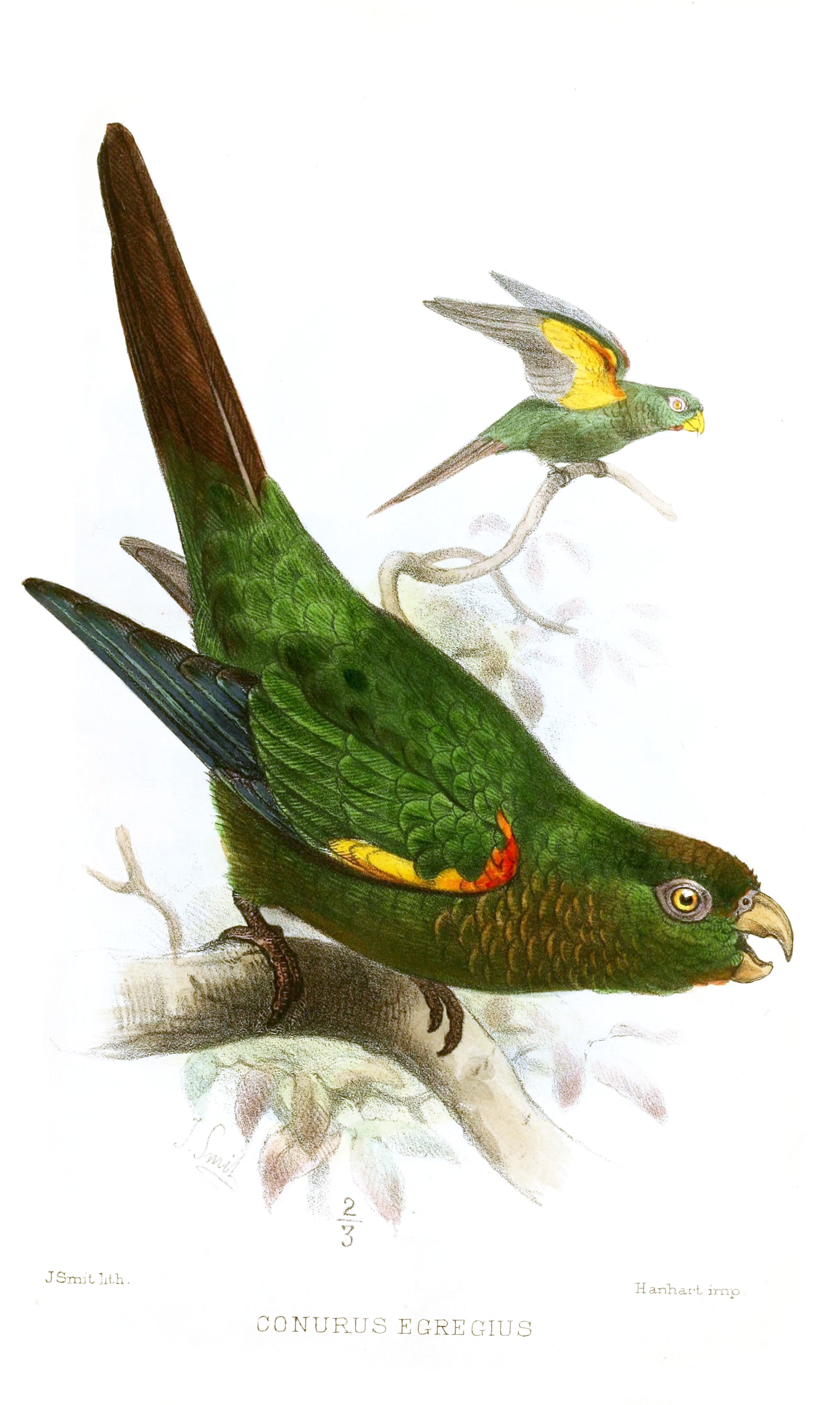

Conservation status
- Least Concern (IUCN 3.1)

Scientific classification
- Kingdom: Animalia
- Phylum: Chordata
- Class: Aves
- Order: Psittaciformes
- Family: Psittacidae
- Genus: Pyrrhura
- Species: P. egregia

Binomial name
- Pyrrhura egregia (Sclater, PL, 1881)

= Fiery-shouldered parakeet =

Species of bird

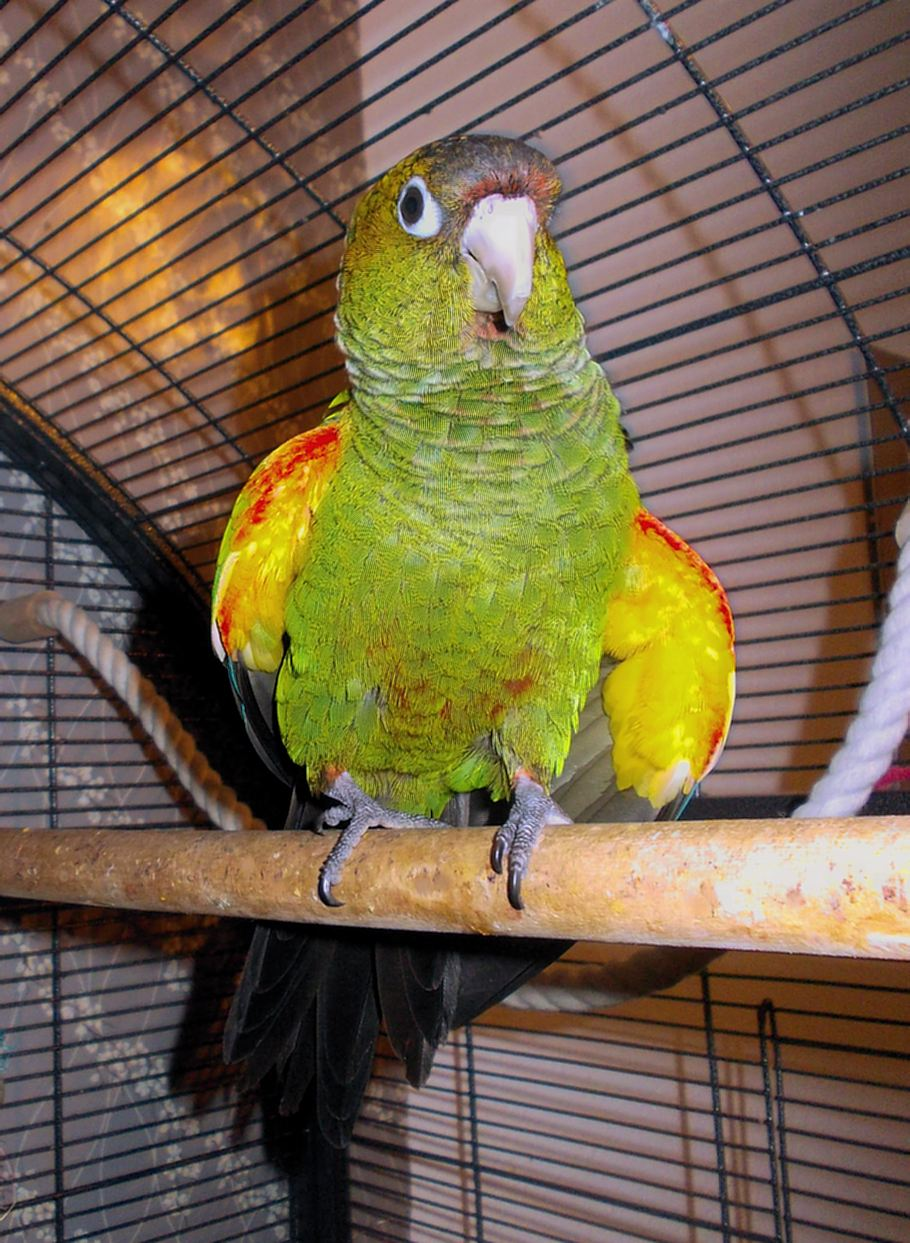

The fiery-shouldered parakeet (Pyrrhura egregia), also known as the fiery-shouldered conure, is a species of parrot in the family Psittacidae. It is found in Brazil, Guyana, and Venezuela. Its natural habitat is subtropical or tropical moist montane forests. There are two subspecies, P. e. egregia and P. e. obscura.

== Description ==
The fiery-shouldered parakeet grows to a length of about 26 cm (10 in) and weighs about 75 g (2.6 oz). In the nominate subspecies (P. e. egregia), the head is grey and the neck and upper parts of the body and wings are green. The front edge of the wing and the underwing coverts are yellow with orange markings. The breast is green barred with brown and yellowish-white. The central part of the abdomen is reddish-brown, as is the upper side of the tail while the underside of the tail is grey. The eye is brown and surrounded by bare white skin, and the beak is horn-coloured. In the other subspecies, P. e. obscura, the upper parts are a deeper shade of green and there is little or no bright colour on the abdomen.

== Distribution and habitat ==
The fiery-shouldered parakeet is endemic to an area of tropical rainforest in South America that includes Guyana, Brazil and Venezuela. Its total area of occupancy is about 50,000 square kilometres (19,000 sq mi) and includes part of the Canaima National Park. The subspecies P. e. egregia is found in southeastern Venezuela and southwestern Guyana while P. e. obscura occurs in southern Venezuela and northeastern Brazil. These parrots are found in primary and secondary forests at altitudes between 700 and 1,800 metres (2,300 and 5,900 ft) and also woodland verges, sometimes visiting parks and gardens.

== Behaviour ==
The fiery-shouldered parakeet is usually seen in small groups of up to 25 individuals. They fly fast and agilely between trees, often emitting shrill cries when they take off. They are rather shy and are adept at hiding themselves among the foliage. They forage in the canopy for plant material and particularly appreciate feeding on Cecropia trees. Little is known of the breeding habits of these birds.

== Conservation status ==
Although the fiery-shouldered parakeet has a restricted range it has been described as being "fairly common". Its rainforest habitat is under threat from logging and its numbers are thought to be declining, however the rate of decline is slow and the International Union for Conservation of Nature has assessed the bird as being of "least concern".
