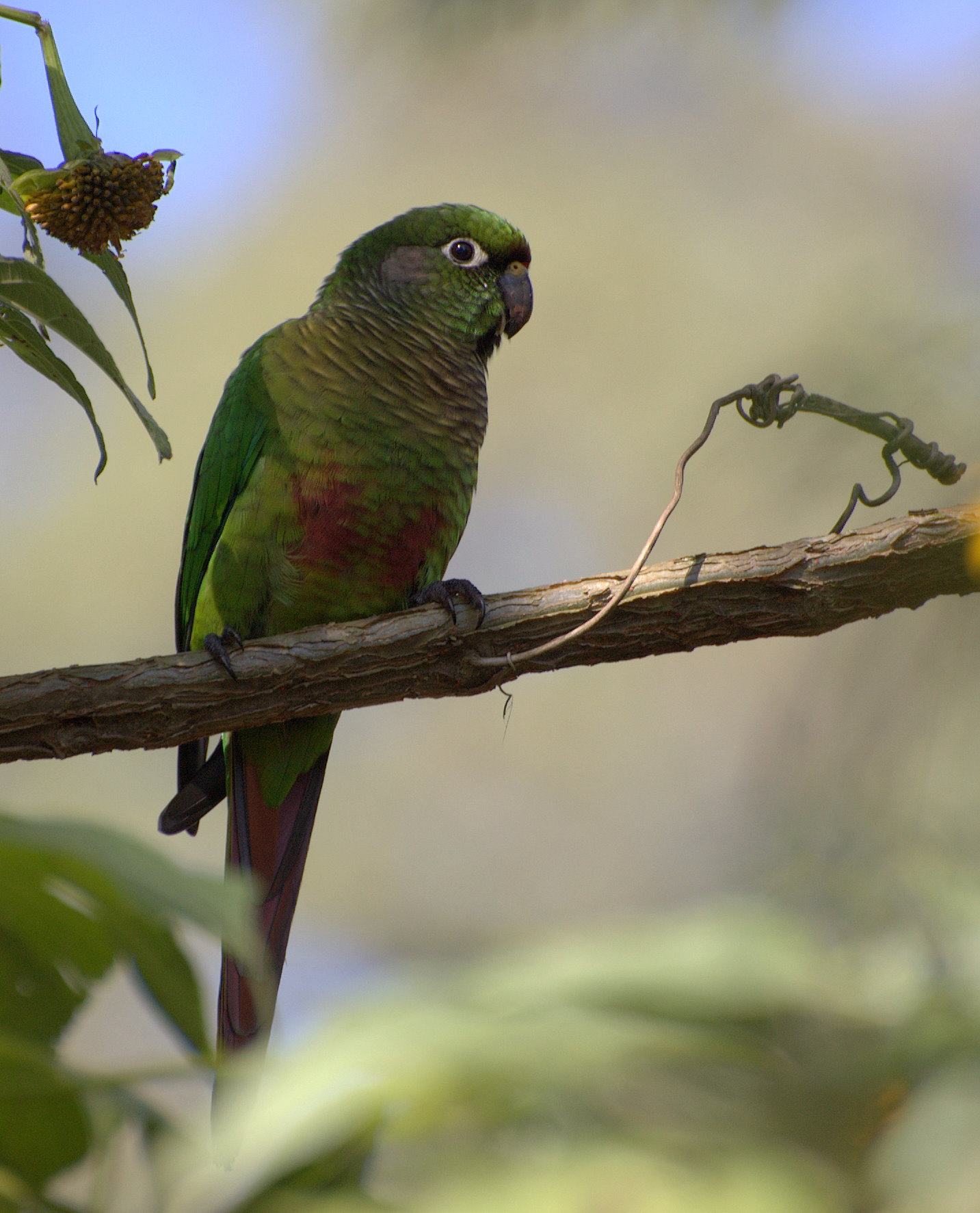
- Pyrrhura frontalis frontalis São Paulo (Brazil)

Conservation status
- Least Concern (IUCN 3.1)

Scientific classification
- Kingdom: Animalia
- Phylum: Chordata
- Class: Aves
- Order: Psittaciformes
- Family: Psittacidae
- Genus: Pyrrhura
- Species: P. frontalis

Binomial name
- Pyrrhura frontalis (Vieillot, 1818)

Synonyms
- Pyrrhura frontalis kriegi

= Maroon-bellied parakeet =

Species of bird

The maroon-bellied parakeet (Pyrrhura frontalis) is a small parrot found from southeastern Brazil to north-eastern Argentina, including eastern Paraguay and Uruguay. It is also known as the reddish-bellied parakeet, and in aviculture it is usually referred to as the maroon-bellied conure, reddish-bellied conure or brown-eared conure.

== Taxonomy ==
The maroon-bellied parakeet was formally described in 1818 by the French ornithologist Louis Vieillot and given the binomial name Psittacus frontalis. Vieillot based his description on "La Perruche Ara à bandeau rouge" that had been described and illustrated by François Levaillant in 1801. The specific epithet frontalis is Modern Latin meaning "fronted" or "browed". Levaillant specified the locality as Brazil but Vieillot mistakenly changed this to Cayenne in French Guiana where the species does not occur. The locality is now restricted to the state of Espírito Santo in Brazil. The English naturalist George Shaw was formerly credited with introducing a binomial name for this species. In 1811 he had described the "banded parrakeet" and coined the name Psittacus vittatus, but in 1917 the American ornithologist Harry C. Oberholser pointed out that this name was invalid as the identical binomial name had been coined in 1783 by the Dutch naturalist Pieter Boddaert for the Puerto Rican amazon, now Amazona vittata. The maroon-bellied parakeet is now one of 24 parakeets placed in the genus Pyrrhura that was introduced in 1856 by the French naturalist Charles Lucien Bonaparte.

Two subspecies are recognised:

- P. f. frontalis (Vieillot, 1818) – east Brazil
- P. f. chiripepe (Vieillot, 1818) – southeast Brazil to southeast Paraguay and north Argentina

It has been suggested that the reddish-bellied parakeet should include the blaze-winged parakeet (P. devillei) as a subspecies based on intermediate specimens from Paraguay. But such hybrids are not common in the wild and the two populations generally maintain their integrity; recent sources are undecided on whether to treat them as one species or two.

== Description ==
These birds range from 25 to 28 cm (9.8 to 11.0 in), and are primarily green, with a maroon patch on the belly, a "scaly" yellow-green-barred breast and sides of neck, a whitish ear-patch often tinged brown, and a maroon undertail. The specific name frontalis is a reference to its dark maroon frontlet – a feature which separates it from most similar species. The primaries are blue on the outer webs, green on the inner webs, and dark on the tips. The beak is black.

The nominate subspecies P. f. frontalis has a greenish-yellow uppertail grading into a broad reddish tip. The subspecies P. f. chiripepe has a greenish-yellow uppertail without the reddish tip. Another subspecies, kriegi, was described from Bahia by Alfred Laubmann in 1932, but today it is universally considered a junior synonym of the nominate subspecies. Distinguished by a narrow brownish-red tip to the tail, it constitutes just a morph or an intermediate genotype making up just 20% of the specimens even in the supposed range. The name Krieg's conure is occasionally used in aviculture for such birds, and some breed them exclusively; they are of course perfectly interfertile with individuals of the normal morph however.

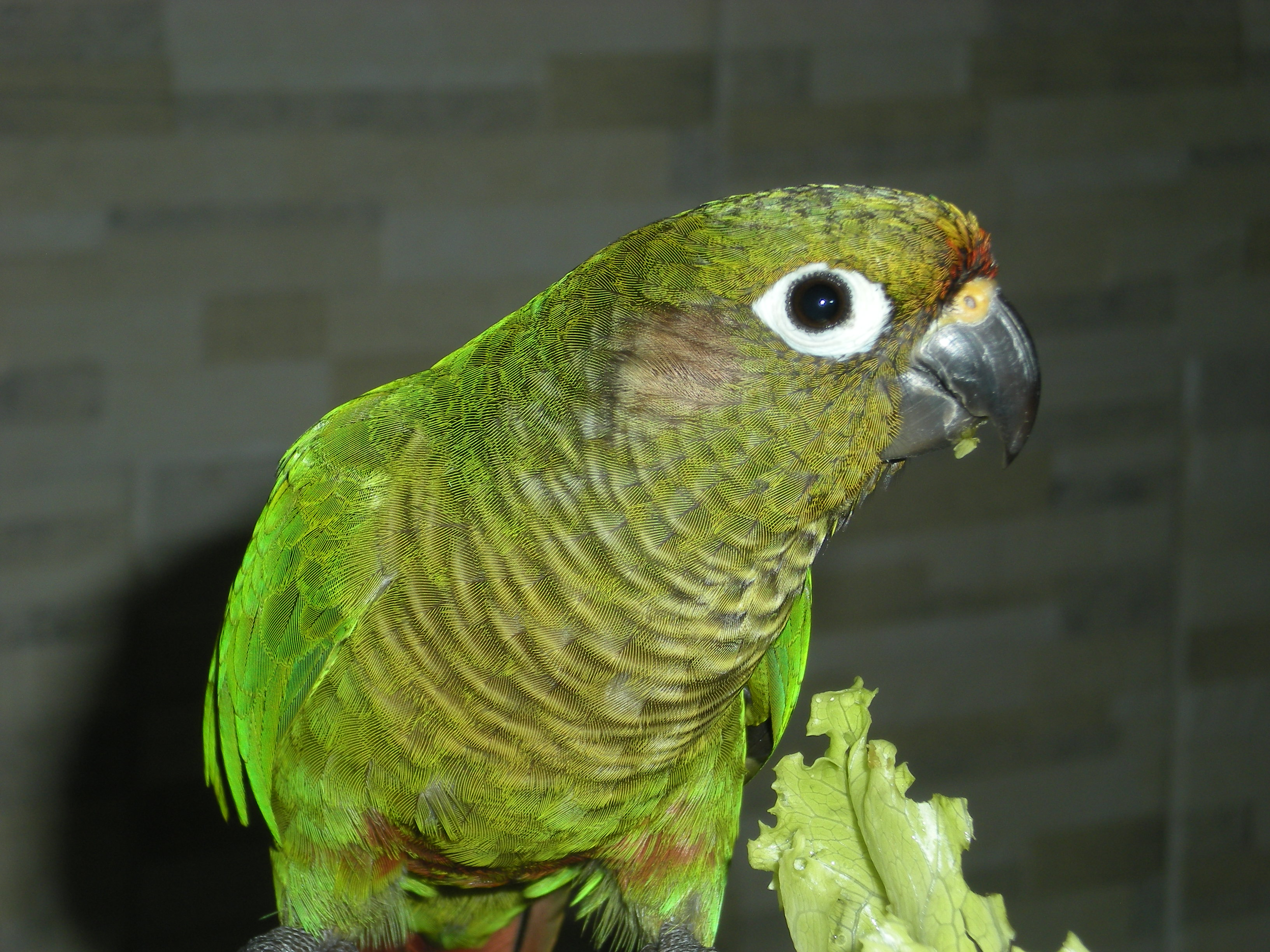
Domestic maroon-bellied parakeet eating lettuce

== Distribution and habitat ==
The maroon-bellied parakeet is common in woodland, and forest edges. In the northern part of its range, it mainly lives in highlands up to 1,400 m (4,600 ft), but elsewhere it is primarily found in lowlands up to 1,000 m (3,300 ft). Tolerates disturbance well and even lives in urban parks (e.g., Rio de Janeiro and São Paulo) and feeds in gardens. Flock size is usually only 6–12 individuals, but up to 40. As other members of the genus Pyrrhura, it primarily feeds on fruits, flowers, and similar plant matter; they rarely participate in mixed-species feeding flock.

== Status ==
It is generally common and not considered threatened by the IUCN. Though there is little trade in these parrots, captive-bred birds are occasionally available as pets. Maroon-bellied parakeets can learn to talk, although not clearly. They are among the quietest conures, but their shrill voices still irritate some people.
