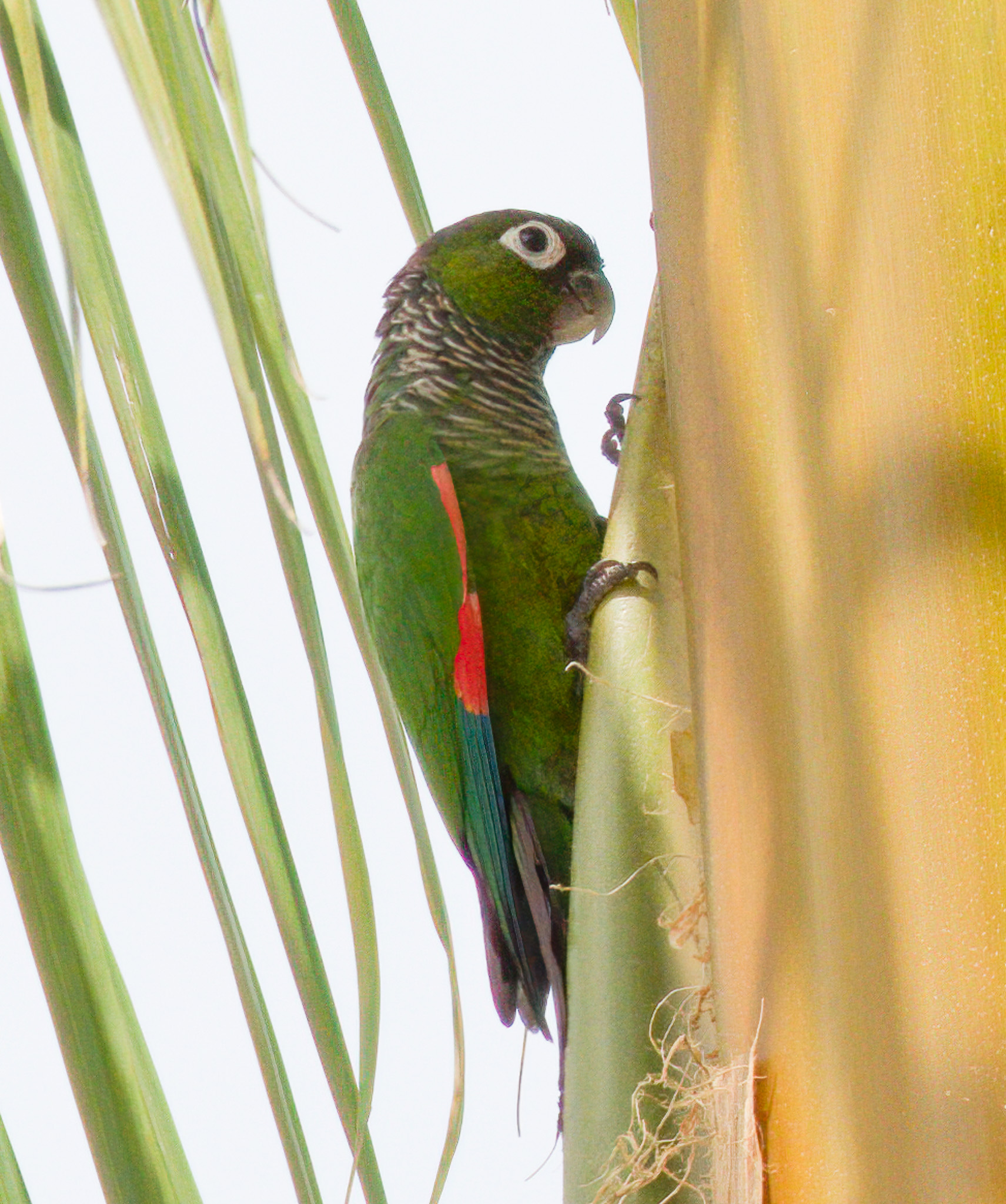
- Subspecies P. m. melanura

Conservation status
- Least Concern (IUCN 3.1)(See the Status section)
- CITES Appendix II (CITES)

Scientific classification
- Kingdom: Animalia
- Phylum: Chordata
- Class: Aves
- Order: Psittaciformes
- Family: Psittacidae
- Genus: Pyrrhura
- Species: P. melanura

Binomial name
- Pyrrhura melanura (Spix, 1824)
- Range of the maroon-tailed parakeet's P. m. melanura, P. m. souancei, and P. m. berlepschi subspecies

= Maroon-tailed parakeet =

Species of bird

The maroon-tailed parakeet (Pyrrhura melanura) is a species of bird in subfamily Arinae of the family Psittacidae, the African and New World parrots. It is found in Brazil, Colombia, Ecuador, Peru, and Venezuela.

== Taxonomy and systematics ==
The International Ornithological Committee and the Clements taxonomy assign these five subspecies to the maroon-tailed parakeet:

- P. m. pacifica Chapman, 1915
- P. m. chapmani Bond & Meyer de Schauensee, 1940
- P. m. melanura (Spix, 1824)
- P. m. souancei (Verreaux, 1858)
- P. m. berlepschi Salvadori, 1891

BirdLife International's Handbook of the Birds of the World (HBW) treats P. m. pacifica and P. m. chapmani as separate species, the "Choco" and "Upper Magdalena" parakeets, respectively. Note that the range map excludes these two taxa.

This article follows the five-subspecies model.

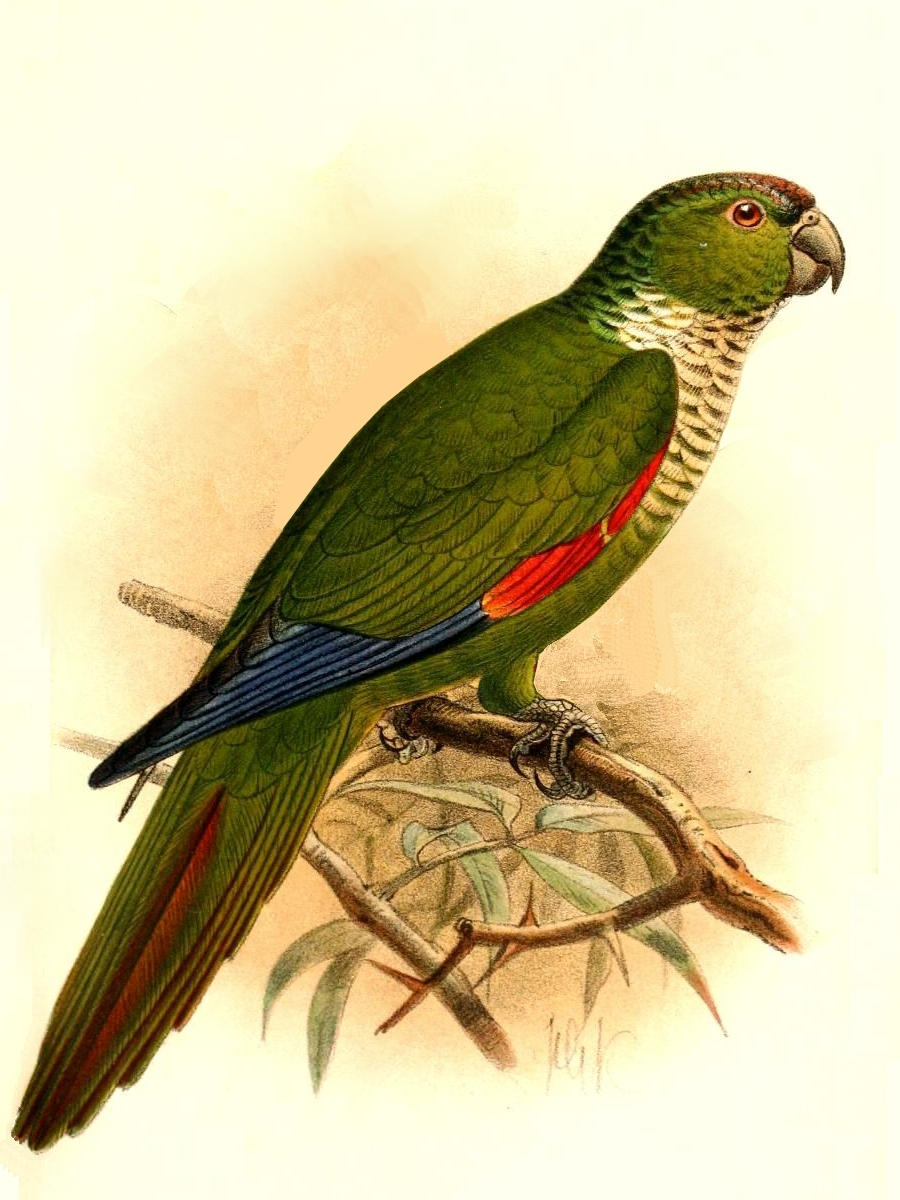
Maroon-tailed parakeet, P. m. berlepschi

== Description ==
The maroon-tailed parakeet is 23 to 25 cm (9.1 to 9.8 in) long and weighs about 83 g (2.9 oz). The sexes are the same. Adults of the nominate subspecies P. m. melanura have a mostly green head with a brown crown and nape. Their upperparts are green. Their throat, the sides of their neck, and their breast are dark green with buffy whitish feather edges that give a scaly appearance. The rest of their underparts are green. Their wing is mostly green with red and yellowish orange primary coverts; their primaries are mostly blue. Their tail's upper surface is maroon with a green base and its under surface is dusky grayish. Their bill is grayish, their iris dark brown with bare white skin surrounding it, and their legs and feet blackish gray. Immature birds are similar to adults but with less red on the primary coverts.

Subspecies P. m. pacifica is darker than the nominate and has no yellow on its primary coverts. Its breast scaling is darker and narrower, its eye ring gray, and its bill blackish. P. m. chapmani is larger than the nominate with less red on its wing and a red patch on its belly. The scaly appearance of its breast extends around the back of its neck. P. m. souancei has a more heavily scaled throat than the nominate, with no yellow on the primary coverts, sometimes red on its carpals, a brownish red belly, and a blacker undertail. P. m. pacifica has even heavier throat scaling than souancei, red carpals, and a brownish red belly.

== Distribution and habitat ==
The subspecies of the maroon-tailed parakeet are found thus:

- P. m. pacifica, Pacific slope of the Andes from Colombia's Nariño Department south to Ecuador's Cotopaxi Province
- P. m. chapmani, the upper valley of the Magdalena River on the eastern slope of Colombia's Central Andes in Tolima and Huila departments
- P. m. melanura, the upper Amazon Basin in southern Venezuela, southeastern Colombia, eastern Ecuador, northeastern Peru, and northwestern Brazil
- P. m. souancei, the eastern slope of the Andes from the Serranía de la Macarena in south-central Colombia into eastern Ecuador and perhaps northern Peru
- P. m. berlepschi, the eastern slope of the Andes from Morona-Santiago Province in Ecuador to the Huallaga River valley in northern Peru

The maroon-tailed parakeet inhabits the canopy and edges of a variety of landscapes including wet lowland premontane forest, cloudforest, várzea, terra firme, and also partially cleared areas. It is most common between 500 and 1,700 m (1,600 and 5,600 ft) of elevation, but P. m. pacifica ranges up to 2,200 m (7,200 ft), P. m. souancei to 3,200 m (10,500 ft), and P. m. berlepschi to 3,200 m (10,500 ft). P. m. chapmani is the exception; it ranges between 1,600 and 2,800 m (5,200 and 9,200 ft).

== Behavior ==
=== Movement ===
The maroon-tailed parakeet is thought to be generally sedentary, but some subspecies are believed to make seasonal elevational movements.

=== Feeding ===
The maroon-tailed parakeet typically forages in flocks of about six to 12 individuals. Its diet is not known in detail but includes fruit from forest trees and palms, and also cultivated fruits like mangoes and guavas.

=== Breeding ===
The maroon-tailed parakeet's breeding season varies geographically; P. m. melanura breeds between April and June and P. m. berlepschi between January and March. P. m. chapmani's season includes January; its details and those of the other two subspecies are not known. In captivity the clutch size is usually four eggs, the incubation period about 25 days, and the time to fledging seven to eight weeks.

=== Vocalization ===
The maroon-tailed parakeet's most common call is "a series of loud, harsh notes, e.g. screeet screeet screeet" that is given both from a perch and in flight. However, perched birds are often silent. Members of a flock "call frequently and simultaneously, producing a noisy, harsh chattering ."

== Status ==
The IUCN follows HBW taxonomy, and so has assessed the "Upper Magdalena" and "Choco" parakeets separately from the maroon-tailed parakeet sensu stricto. The "Upper Magdalena" parakeet is assessed as Vulnerable. It has a limited range and its estimated population of between 8000 and 14,000 mature individuals is believed to be decreasing. The principal threat is deforestation, especially for timber. It formerly was significantly affected by the pet trade; this has abated but the species is still hunted in places. The "Choco" parakeet is assessed as being of Least Concern. It has a somewhat limited range and an unknown population size; the latter is believed to be stable. No immediate threats have been identified. The maroon-tailed parakeet sensu stricto is also assessed as being of Least Concern. It has a large range but its population size is not known and is believed to be decreasing. Like the "Upper Magdalena" parakeet it was formerly affected by the pet trade and is currently under pressure from deforestation for timber and agriculture and by hunting. With the exception of chapmani the species is considered to be generally fairly common and in some areas is the most numerous parrot. It occurs in several protected areas.
