= Charles de Souancé =

French ornithologist and French Navy officer (1823–1896)

Charles de Souancé (2 May 1823 – 23 January 1896) was a French ornithologist and a purser in the French Navy, more precisely "Commissaire de la Marine". He made many studies on the ornithological collection of his uncle François Victor Masséna and described several new species of parrots (Psittacidae) in the scientific journal Revue et Magazin de Zoologie.

A subspecies of the maroon-tailed parakeet, Pyrrhura melanura souancei, is named for him.

== Published works ==
- Description de quelques nouvelles espèces d'oiseaux de la famille des psittacidés, with François Victor Masséna, 1854 – Description of some new species of birds within the family Psittacidae.
- Iconographie des perroquets, non figurés dans les publications de Levaillant et de M. Bourjot Saint-Hilaire, in collaboration with Charles Lucien Bonaparte and Émile Blanchard, Paris : P. Bertrand, 1857.

== Bibliography ==
- Beolens, Bo; & Watkins, Charles. (2003). Whose Bird? Common Bird Names and the People they Commemorate. Yale University Press: New Haven, Connecticut.
