= Companion parrot =

Type of pet

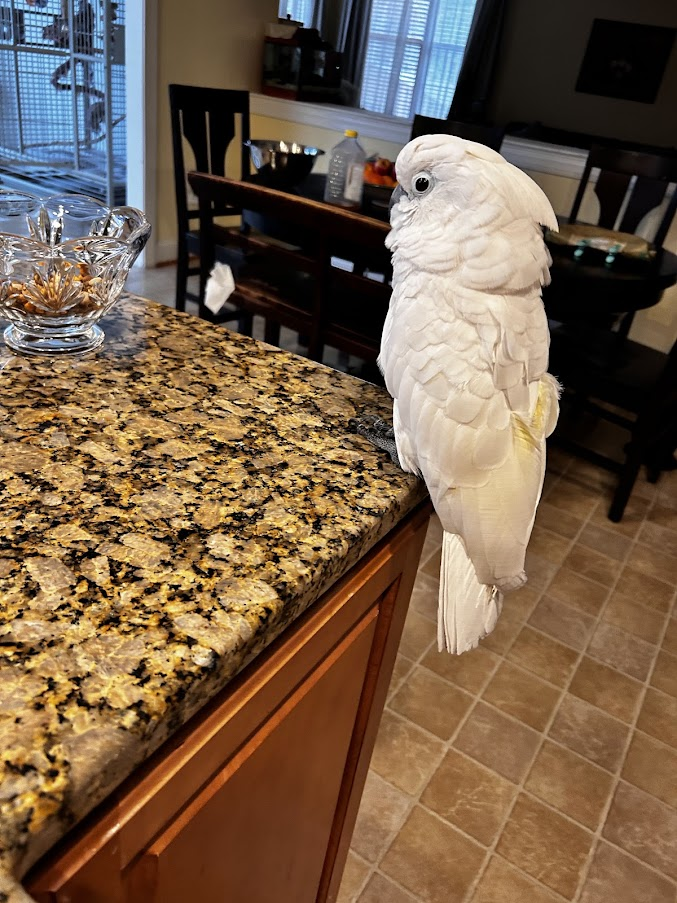
- A pet cockatoo kept as a companion parrot in a domestic kitchen.

A companion parrot is a parrot kept as a pet that interacts abundantly with its human keeper. Parrots are among the most popular companion birds worldwide, but most species are not domesticated and retain the complex behavioural and environmental needs of wild parrots, including flocking, social interaction, varied foraging and regular flight. Reviews of parrot welfare report that many companion parrots develop problems such as stereotypic behaviour, feather damaging and chronic stress when these needs are not met, and that their suitability as pets is often limited by these welfare concerns.

Species of parrots that are kept as companions include large parrots, such as amazons, greys, cockatoos, eclectuses, hawk-headed parrots, and macaws (including hybrids like the Catalina macaw); mid-sized birds, such as caiques, conures, Quaker parrots, cockatiels, Pionus, Poicephalus, rose-ringed parakeets, and rosellas; and many of the smaller types, including budgies, Brotogeris, parakeets, lovebirds(not all species), parrotlets(not all species) and lineolated parakeets.

Some species of lories and lorikeets are kept as pets but are quite messy, and often more popular as aviary birds. Hanging parrots and fig parrots are normally kept as aviary birds and not as pets. Some species of parrots such as pygmy parrots, kākāpōs, night parrots, pyrilia parrots and about half of the species of parrotlets and lovebirds, are not considered companion parrots due to difficult dietary requirements, non-survival in captivity or lack of availability.

The Convention on International Trade in Endangered Species of Wild Fauna and Flora (CITES) lists most parrot species in its appendices and restricts international trade in wild-caught birds. Commercial trade in wild individuals of Appendix I species is prohibited, while Appendix II and III species may be traded only under permit systems intended to ensure that exports are not detrimental to wild populations. In some range countries, abundant species such as the monk parakeet are also subject to lethal control programmes because they are treated as agricultural pests.

== Maintenance ==
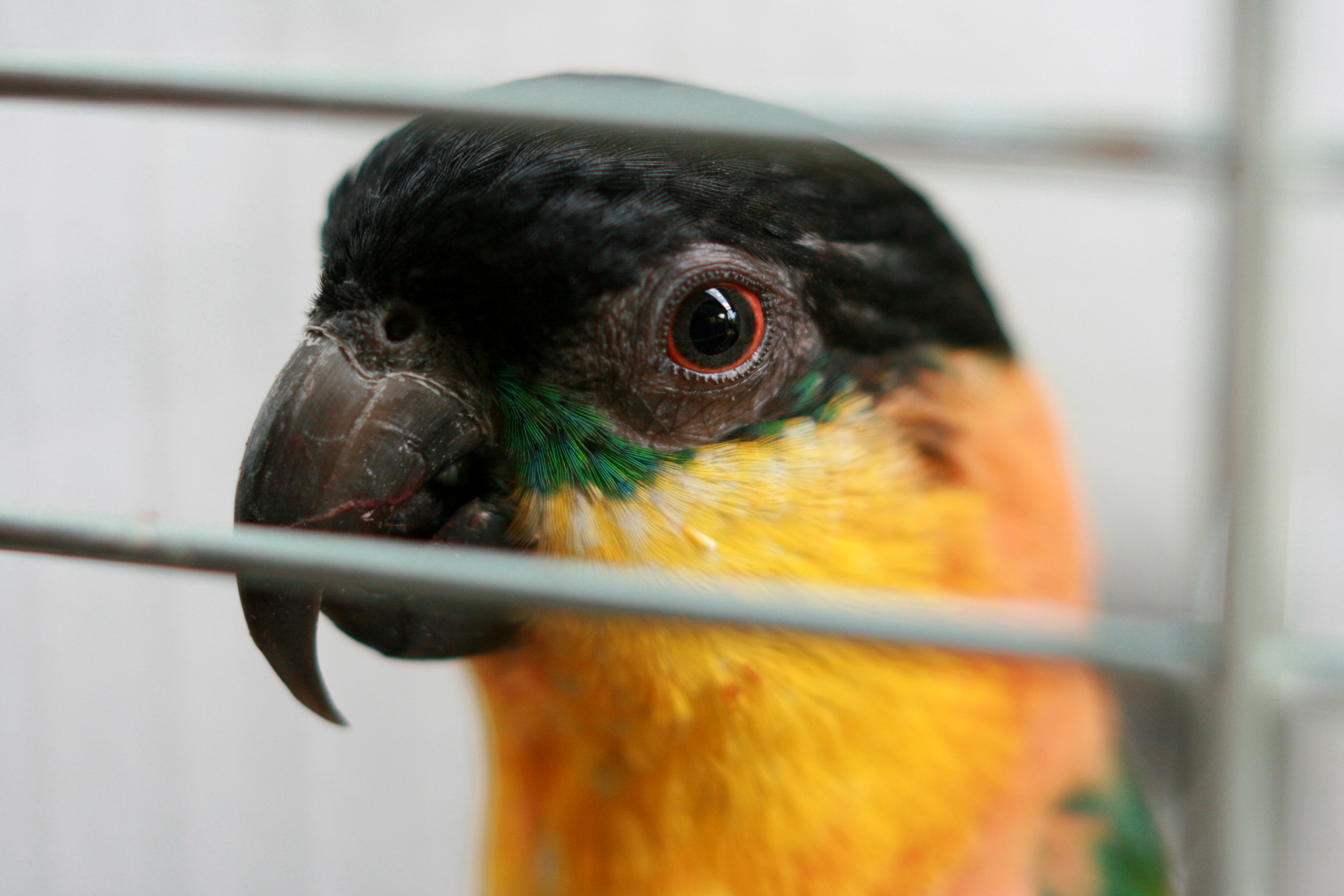
Black-headed caique in their cage

With the right home, parrots have the potential to make excellent, highly interactive, affectionate, and entertaining pets prized by their owners, but should not be considered easy care or low-maintenance pets. Tame companion parrots require daily attention and interaction with their owners, and need to be housed in a cage large enough to allow the bird to spread their wings and move about comfortably. Companion parrots also need to be fed a diet that includes fresh vegetables and fruits, and a smaller amount of seeds and grains; dietary requirements vary with species and activity level.

Other elements essential to a companion parrot's well-being include appropriate toys to chew up and play with; veterinary care; and social time out of the cage whenever possible—preferably on play gyms or other out-of-cage perches. Larger parrots can be expensive to care for, messy, destructive, and loud, and some individuals may exhibit some aggressive behaviors during adolescence. Like dogs, parrots require some amount of basic training and proper early socialization to mature into good companions. Their intelligence means parrots learn new behaviors—both good and bad—easily.

Many birds end up having to be rehomed because their owners did not adequately understand the level of care required when they purchased the bird, did not understand how loud they can be, or did not understand how to properly socialize and train their bird. This is especially true for macaws and other species with dramatic colouring, as well as cockatoos due to their intensely affectionate demeanor. These traits unfortunately make them tempting impulse purchases, leading to hundreds of macaws and cockatoos being put up for adoption.

=== Pellets and formulated diets ===
In more recent years, pellets or formulated diets have become very popular, especially in the US. They offer an advantage over a seed-based diet in that a parrot cannot pick out and eat only its favorite (usually fatty) seeds. The majority of avian veterinarians will recommend a pelleted or formulated diet, and will extensively discuss with owners what their bird should and should not eat. However, although these offer an easy alternative to other foods, they are not the best for many species. Many pellets contain artificial food dyes and preservatives that may be harmful; however there are "no-color-added" options available on the market.

Most pellets contain soy, which is not a part of a parrot's natural diet; however, the diet of wild parrots cannot be replicated in captivity. Avian veterinarians and nutritionists agree the pelleted and formulated diets are the best base diet for pet birds. Although pellets may be advertised as a "complete diet," there are dozens of species of parrots commonly kept as pets, all with varying nutritional needs. There are still many birds which develop problems such as vitamin toxicity, fatty liver disease or gout, despite being on a pelleted diet.

A common mistake made by owners feeding pellets is over-supplementing them with fresh food. As a pellet is, essentially, a supplemented grain, supplementing them even more "dilutes" the diet, making the pellets less efficient and the diet unbalanced. The best diet for a bird should be determined by an avian veterinarian.

==== Additional diet requirements ====
While a wild diet can never be replicated, it can be used as a guide for a companion parrot's diet. One aspect that can be mimicked is the variety of foods in the diet. Parrots in the wild spend a lot of time being active, flying and searching for food. In captivity, parrots spend much less energy daily, so the bird will need less food. Because of this, foods with a high-fat content (such as fatty seeds) should be fed sparingly, since a companion parrot does not get the amount of exercise to necessitate such a high-fat diet. Adding some variety to the parrot's diet not only adds nutritional value but also enrichment for the mind.

==== Adding fresh fruit and vegetables ====
Fresh fruits and vegetables provide vitamins and minerals and are an important addition to a pelleted diet. Raw fruits and vegetables are most suitable, if thoroughly rinsed before feeding them to the parrot. Canned produce has a high-salt content and also requires rinsing before serving to the bird. Cooking the produce removes some of the nutrition. Companion parrots enjoy a wide variety of fruits and vegetables, lists of which are often found on the internet.

==== Foods to limit or avoid ====
Some foods (including some fruits and vegetables) are toxic to parrots and should never be fed to them. All fruit pits and seeds, any part of an avocado, chocolate, caffeine and alcohol should never be given to parrots. Other foods are not necessarily toxic, but should only be given in a limited capacity. Two examples of this are garlic and onion. Another food to be limited is dairy products. Parrots cannot digest lactose and can have digestive problems if given too much dairy. Owners are instructed to give dairy products as a treat and only sparingly. While companion parrots can enjoy many of the foods that their human caretakers eat, foods that are too high in salt, fat or sugar can cause health problems and lead to poor diet and nutrition if given to parrots too regularly.

== As pets ==
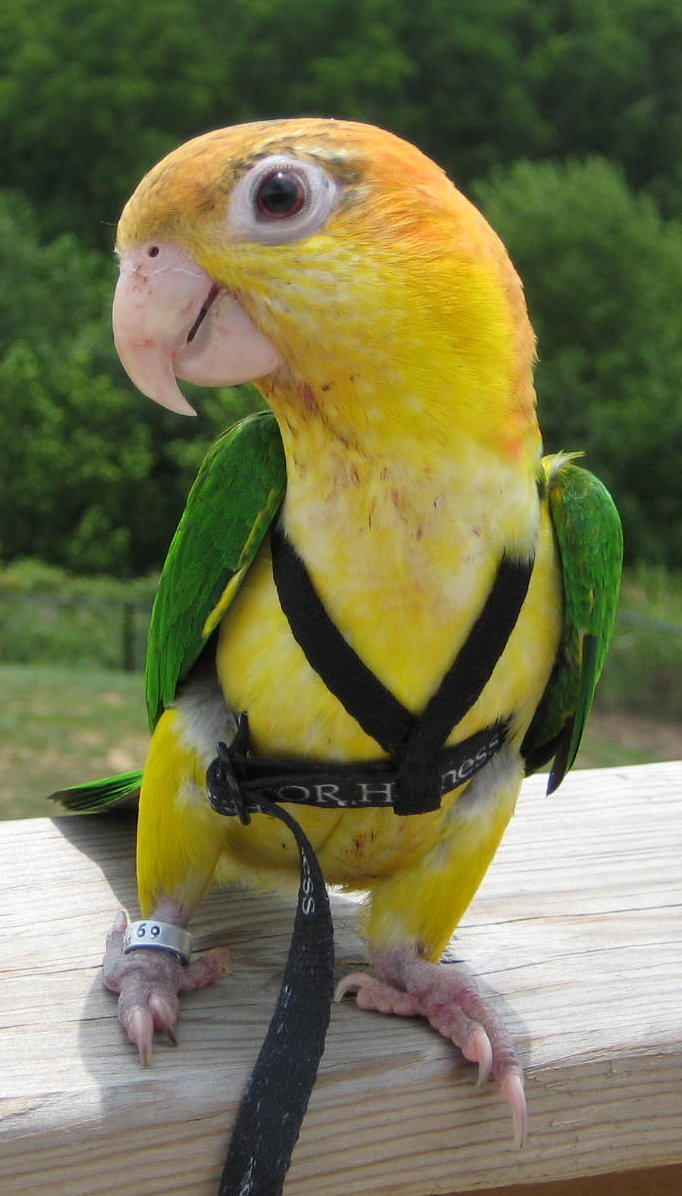
A pet juvenile black-legged parrot wearing a harness out-of-doors

Parrots can be rewarding pets to the right owners, due to their intelligence and desire to interact with people. Many parrots are affectionate, even cuddly with trusted people, and require a lot of attention from their owners constantly. Some species have a tendency to bond to one or two people, and dislike strangers, unless they are regularly and consistently handled by different people. Properly socialized parrots can be friendly, outgoing and confident companions.

When tame, parrots may allow and appreciate petting and cuddling from their owner; however, in certain circumstances, such as petting the back and beneath the wings (in the wild, only the bird's mate will touch a parrot in this manner), the bird may misinterpret this physical contact as sexual behaviour. This may then lead to unwanted hormonal aggression, nesting behaviour and chronic egg laying in pet birds.

Most pet parrots take readily to trick training. Trick training can also help to redirect a bird's energy and prevent or correct many behavior problems. Some owners successfully use well behaved parrots as therapy animals. Some owners have trained their parrots to wear parrot harnesses (most easily accomplished with young birds) so that they can be taken to enjoy themselves outdoors in a relatively safe manner without the risk of flying away. Parrots are prey animals and even the tamest pet may fly off if spooked.

Although parrots can be messy pets—often throwing food and damaging furniture with their beaks if they can—most parrots may be potty trained to some extent and are generally odorless; however, certain species of Amazona and Pionus have a distinctive odor most owners find pleasant. Most parrot species, with some notable exceptions, are relatively good pets for most pet allergy sufferers. However, all the species of white cockatoos produce large quantities of dust from their powder down feathers, which may be problematic for people with allergies. Cockatiels, rose-breasted cockatoos, and greys also produce smaller amounts of feather dust.

== Behavior ==
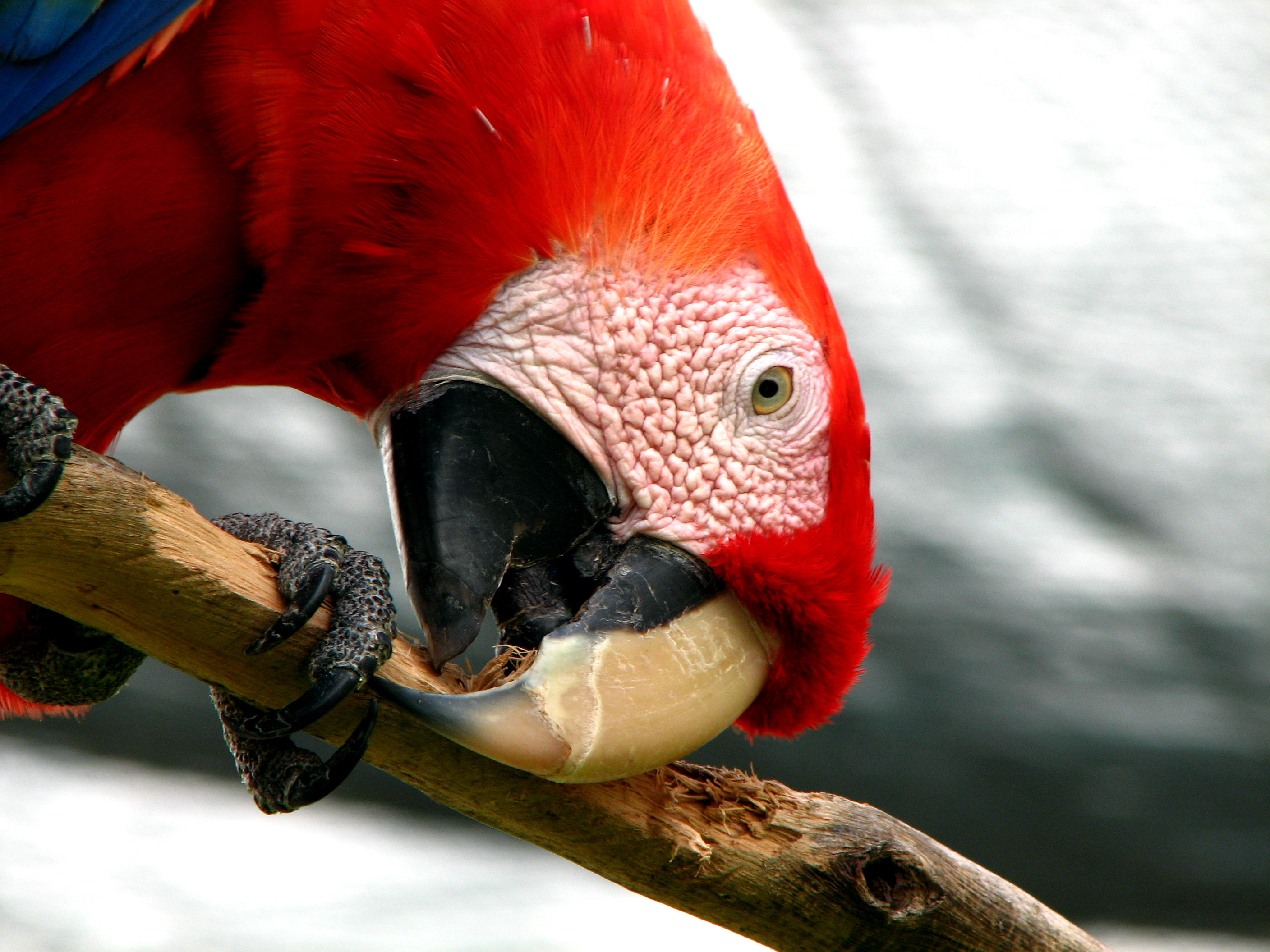
A scarlet macaw chewing wood

Different species (sometimes even different individuals within species) can vary greatly in temperament, noise, and talking ability. For example, Pionus parrots generally have a reserved stance, while at the other end, large cockatoos need at least several hours of attention daily. The upbringing and genetic inclination of an individual bird plays a major role in determining its disposition, regardless of species.

Many of the larger parrots are unsuitable in an apartment setting due to noise level. Although all parrots will make some noise, species that are generally less noisy include parrotlets, budgies, cockatiels, Pyrrhura conures, Pionus, caiques, greys, and usually Poicephalus. Many of the other species of conures can be loud birds. Cockatoos, and many macaws and amazon parrots can be very loud, though normally only at certain times of the day and some birds will learn to scream for attention.

Many people are initially attracted to parrots for their ability to talk, sing, and mimic noises they are exposed to. Some parrot species such as greys, eclectus, quaker parrots, male and some female budgies, and some species of amazon parrots, macaws, and Psittacula are frequently good talkers and mimickers, although there is no guarantee that any individual parrot will talk. Many parrots learn to use words in context; for example, calling family members by name, or requesting certain food items by name. Other species are poor talkers, but popular for their affectionate or playful personalities.

Parrots need a cage large enough to exercise in, stretch their wings, and climb if it will not be out for a good part of the day. Without exercise, parrots tend to become obese and unhealthy.

Toys (enrichment) are necessary for pet parrots. Different birds may have very different toy preferences. Toys should be sized appropriately for the bird's size and destructiveness; for example, a small plastic budgie toy could be dangerous for a large parrot that could break off and ingest a piece. Some birds may prefer wooden toys to chew up; some may prefer bells or other toys that make noise; some may prefer toys with leather strips they can untie; some may prefer a bowl of small 'foot toys' they can throw around. Some birds may destroy their toys quickly. Although commercial bird toys can be expensive, it is possible for owners to save money by making their own toys and providing other items such as cardboard, blocks of wood, pine cones, or freshly cut branches from non-toxic trees for a parrot to chew on and play with.

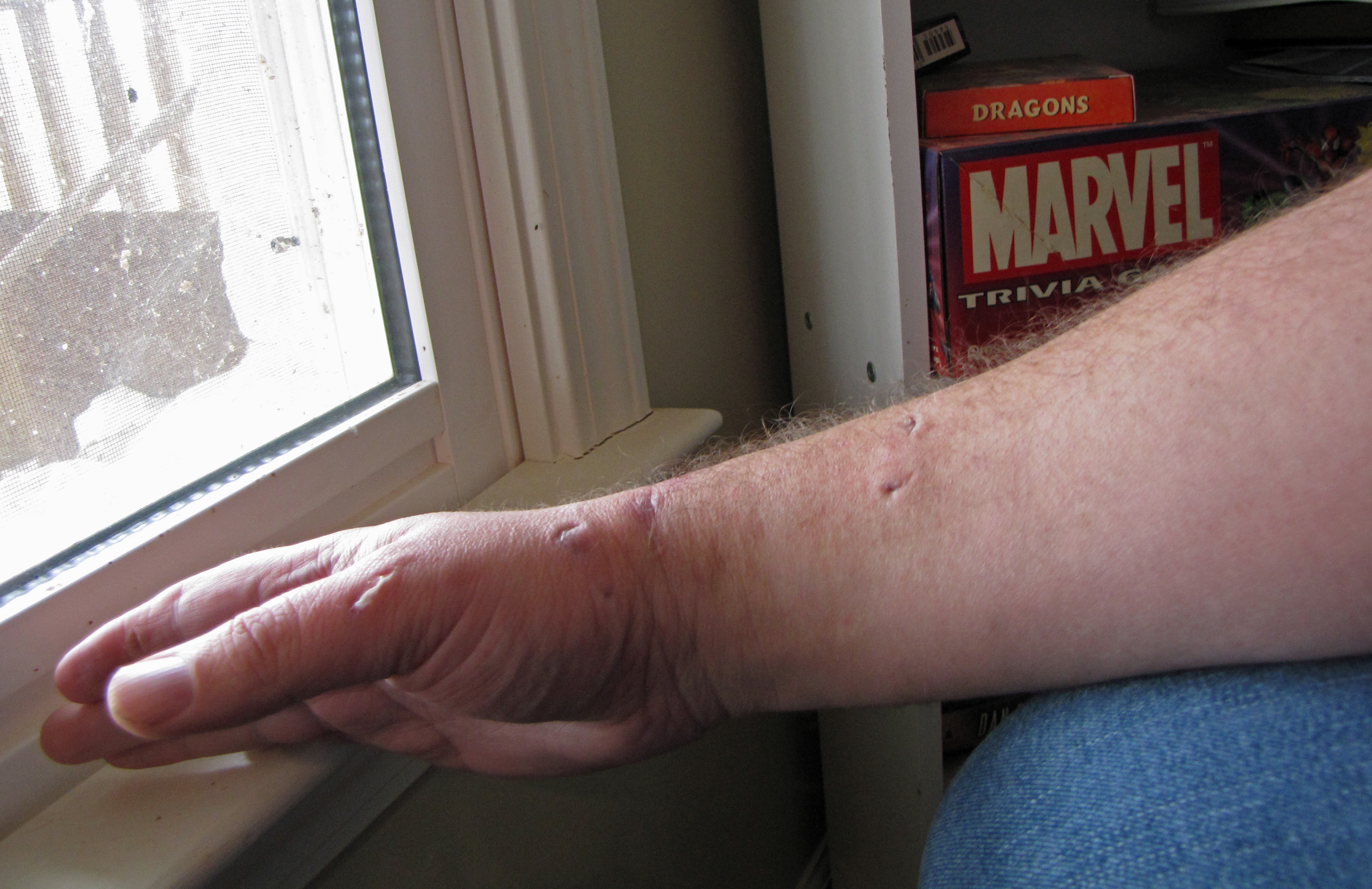
Bite wounds inflicted by a pet blue-and-yellow macaw

Parrots use their hooked beaks to help them to climb around, as well as to shell seeds and nuts. It is normal for a parrot to use its beak to explore and to get around; it is common, for example, for a parrot to rest its beak on a person's hand to steady itself as it steps up. Many parrots also like to gently beak or attempt to preen their owner's hands. However, even tame parrots can bite humans, particularly if confused or frightened, so it is wise to keep larger birds caged around small children they are not familiar with. Large parrots such as macaws and cockatoos have powerful beaks they use for crushing large nuts.

It is generally not recommended to have any large parrot on the shoulder, because it is difficult to observe the parrot there for warning signs prior to a bite, and it is also easier for a parrot to slip and bite to catch itself. A large parrot bite to the face can do severe damage and destroy the trust between owner and bird. Often bites are not intentional; for example, if the bird slips from the owner's shoulder, it is likely to try to grab the nearest thing to hold on to, which may well be an ear or part of the owner's face.

== Household settings ==
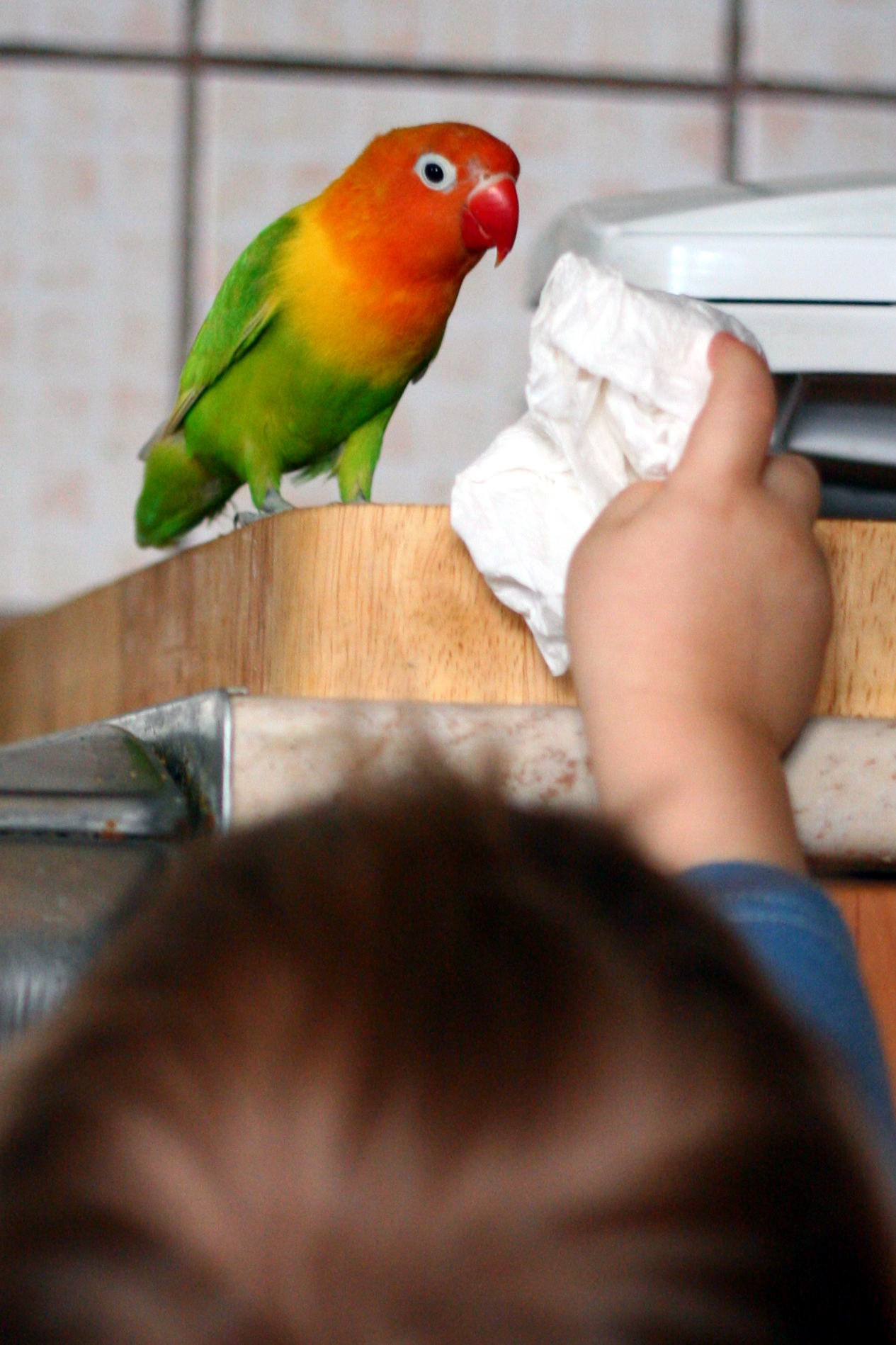
A pet Fischer's lovebird just out of reach of a young child

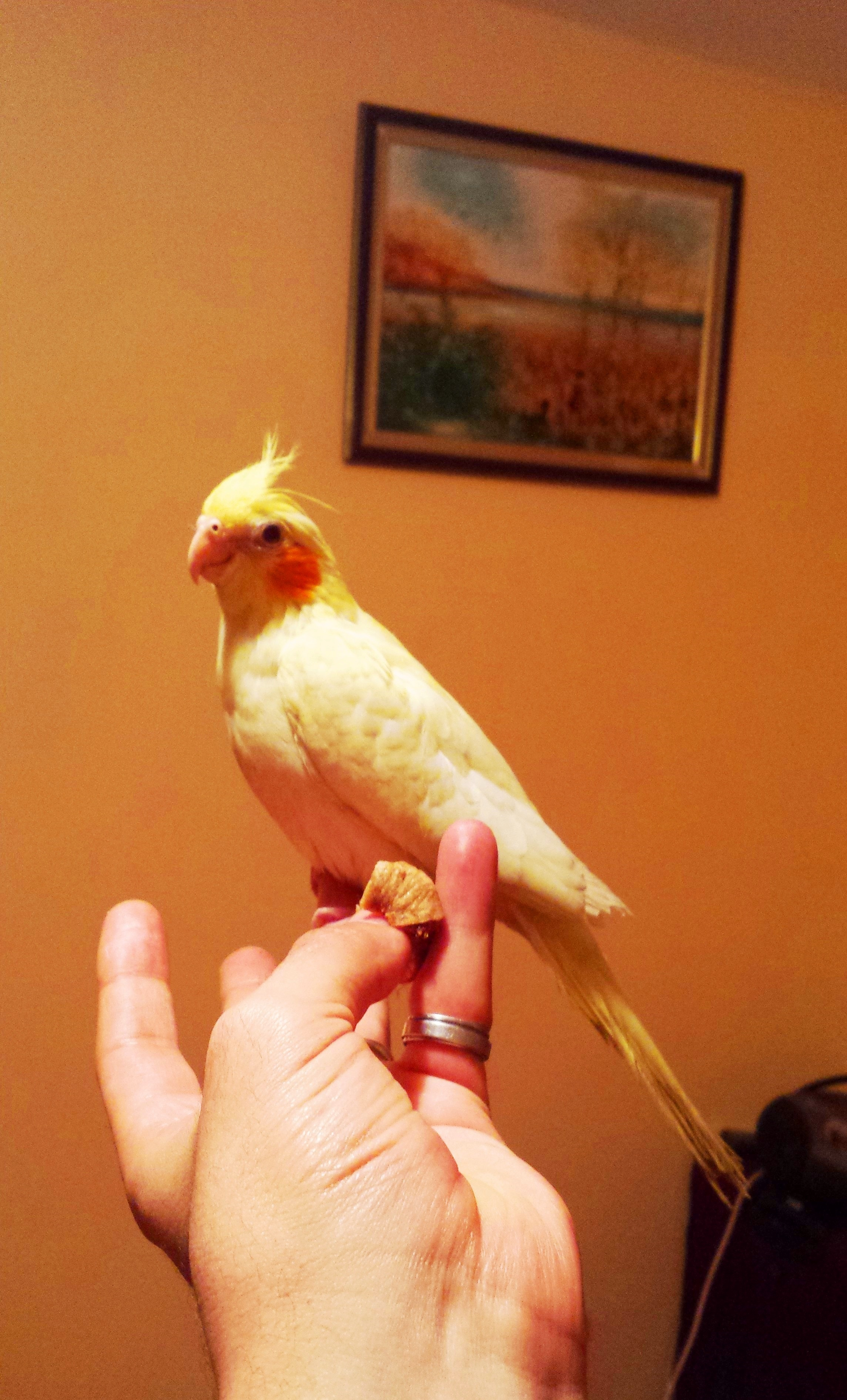
A pet cockatiel on the hand of its companion

While many parrot species do well with well-behaved children, and can be excellent family pets, they are generally not a good child's pet due to their potential lifespan and care required. Parrots require consistent daily care and attention and are also longer lived than most other companion animals. Lifespans range from around 15 years for a budgie or lovebird, to 20–30 years for a cockatiel or small conure, up to 80 to 100 years for amazons and macaws—although a more reasonable lifespan for larger parrots is estimated at 50–60 years.

Additionally, a young child could unintentionally injure a small bird such as a budgie; some parrots unaccustomed to children may find the high energy level and noise of a young child threatening and may bite. The bite strength of larger birds such as Macaws can be very dangerous and is well in excess of even a pit bull dog (375 psi compared to 275 psi). Parrots that have been raised and socialized around children from a young age typically do much better with children than parrots who are introduced to children at a later age.

Households that are suitable for pet parrots are said to be "bird-safe". Parrot owners may take steps such as refraining from the use of ceiling fans, covering mirrors and electrical wiring, avoiding open flames, removing all cookware containing Teflon (which may release fumes that are toxic to parrots when heated) and restricting the use of aerosol sprays, due to the parrot's sensitive respiratory system. To prevent their pets from suffering heavy metal toxicity, owners also ensure that their parrots are unable to chew on items such as keys and jewelry and that cages, cage equipment and parrot toys are free of zinc and lead.

== Adoption ==
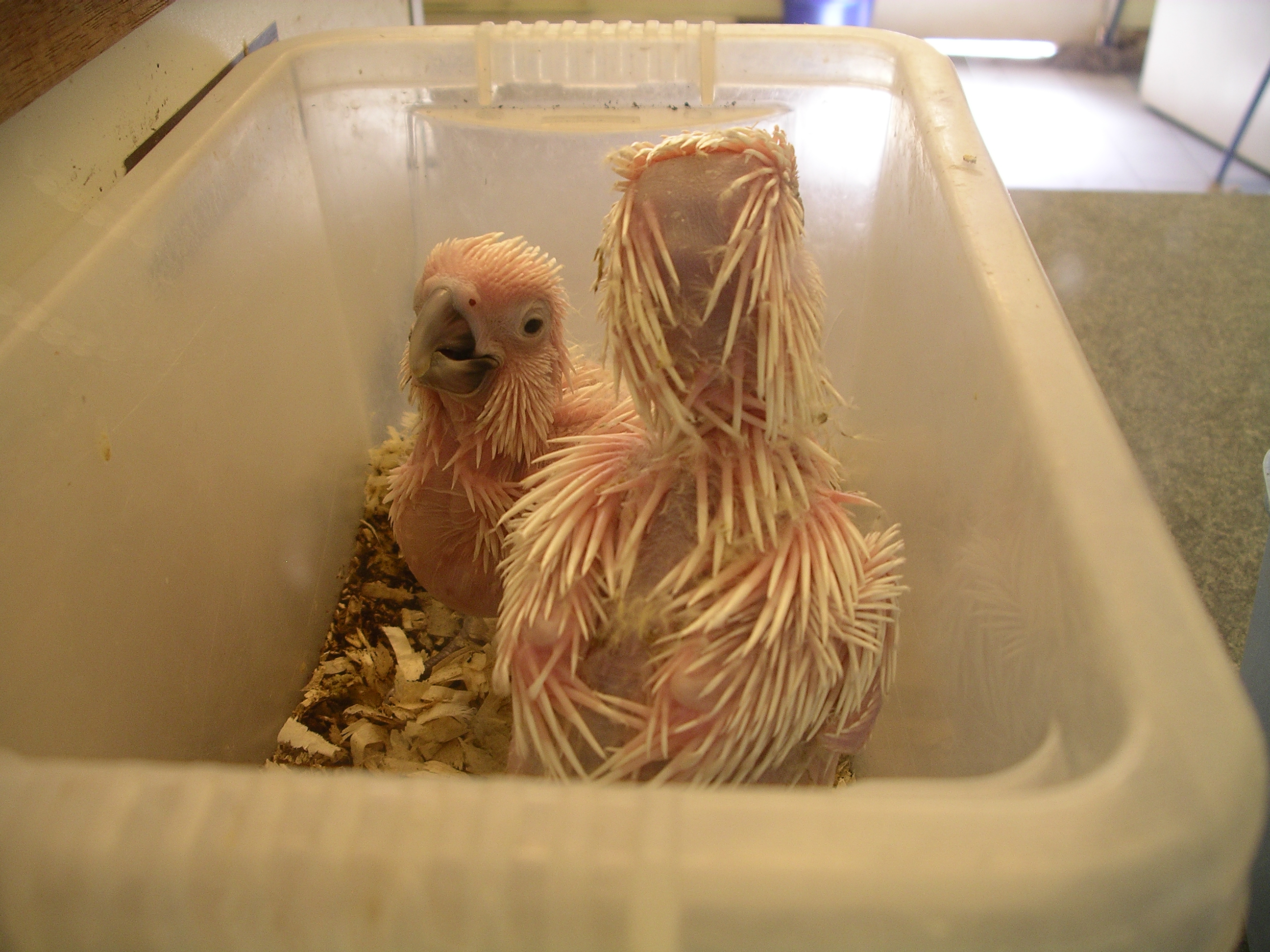
Hand reared umbrella cockatoo chicks

There is a small industry in breeding parrots for the pet trade. Breeders may range from small hobby breeders caring for just a pair or two to large breeding farms that may house hundreds of pairs. When chicks are small, breeders may put a specially made closed bird ring (bird band) on one of their legs with identifying characters stamped into the plastic. A closed ring would not fit over the foot of an adult parrot, so its presence proves that the bird was banded when a young chick.

Some breeders leave the chicks in the nest longer and thus have to use an open band on the bird's leg. However, some breeders do not band the smaller commonly bred parrots, and some owners may have their bird's band removed after purchase because of the possibility that a band might become caught on a toy or other object and cause injury (removal of a band should be done by a veterinarian or experienced person). Bands are the main method for identifying an individual bird, which is helpful if that bird is lost. Sometimes the larger and more expensive parrots are micro-chipped with a tiny security device, as well as being tagged with a leg ring.

Young parrots are available from breeders and specialty bird stores. Reputable sources provide chicks that have been health-checked, socialized with people, and raised according to standard practices. Before going to new homes, hand-reared chicks are typically able to fly, capable of cracking nuts and seeds independently, and weaned from hand-rearing food to a regular diet. Parent raised chicks will have transitioned to appropriate food through natural feeding. Some breeders expose young parrots to additional experiences during development, such as harness-training, travel, and handling by different people including children.

Adult parrots that are rehomed by their owners or offered for adoption from a parrot shelter often make excellent pets after they adjust to a new home. Some of these, however, may have experienced neglect or abuse in their past, and may do best with an experienced parrot owner. The rehoming of a companion parrot, in most cases, can be avoided by doing enough research before acquiring one and determining whether the potential buyer has a lifestyle that suits the species they are considering, and choosing a bird that is most compatible with their lifestyle. Owners should also consider potential lifespan when selecting a species and make appropriate arrangements if the bird is likely to outlive the owner.

== See also ==
- Parrot training
