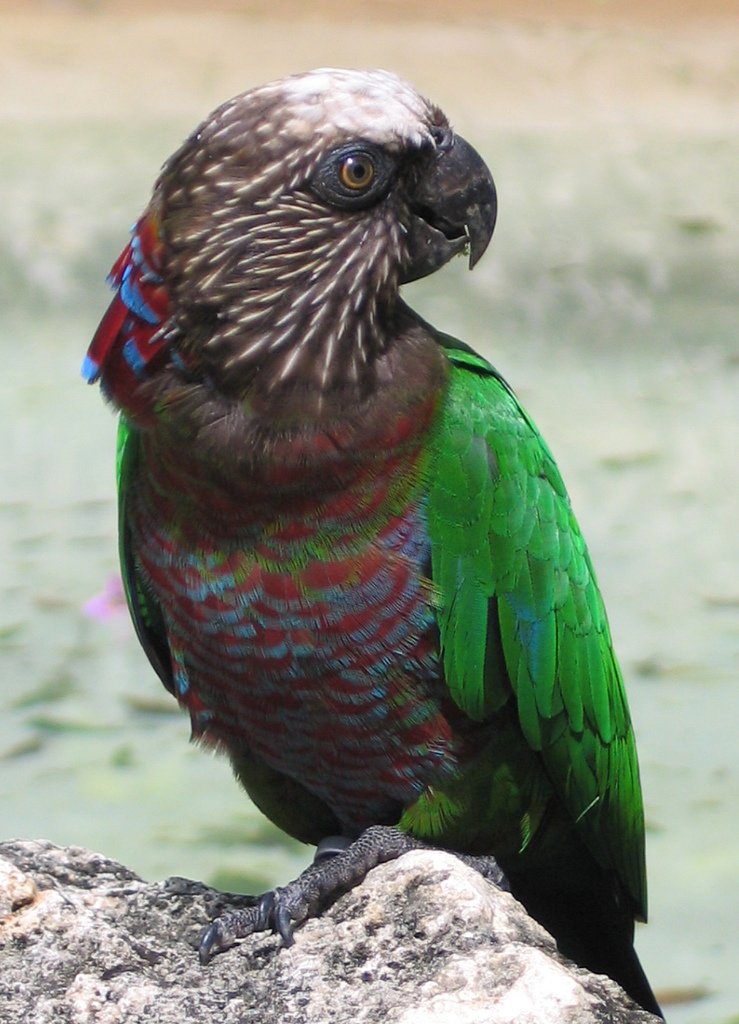

Conservation status
- Least Concern (IUCN 3.1)

Scientific classification
- Kingdom: Animalia
- Phylum: Chordata
- Class: Aves
- Order: Psittaciformes
- Family: Psittacidae
- Subfamily: Arinae
- Genus: Deroptyus; Wagler, 1832
- Species: D. accipitrinus

Binomial name
- Deroptyus accipitrinus (Linnaeus, 1758)
- native range

Synonyms
- Psittacus accipitrinus Linnaeus, 1758

= Red-fan parrot =

Species of bird

The red-fan parrot (Deroptyus accipitrinus), also known as the hawk-headed parrot, is a New World parrot hailing from the Amazon rainforest. It is the only member of the genus Deroptyus.

It is found in Brazil, Suriname, Bolivia, Ecuador, Colombia, areas of northeast Peru, Venezuela, French Guiana and Guyana.

== Taxonomy ==
The red-fan parrot was formally described in 1758 by the Swedish naturalist Carl Linnaeus in the tenth edition of his Systema Naturae. He placed it with all the other parrots in the genus Psittacus and coined the binomial name Psittacus accipitrinus. Linnaeus based his description on the "hawk-headed parrot" that had been described and illustrated in 1751 by the English naturalist George Edwards in the fourth volume of his A Natural History of Uncommon Birds. Linnaeus mistakenly specified the type locality as India. It was redesignated as Cayenne in French Guiana by Carl Hellmayr in 1905. The red-fan parrot is now the only species placed in the genus Deroptyus that was introduced in 1832 by the German naturalist Johann Wagler. The genus name combines the Ancient Greek derē meaning "neck" with ptuon meaning "fan". The specific epithet accipitrinus is from Latin and means "hawk-like".

Two subspecies are recognised:

- D. a. accipitrinus (Linnaeus, 1758) – southeast Colombia to northeast Peru, north Brazil and the Guianas
- D. a. fuscifrons Hellmayr, 1905 – central Brazil south of the Amazon

== Description ==
The red-fan parrot possesses elongated neck feathers that can be raised to form an elaborate fan, which greatly increases the bird's apparent size, and is possibly used when threatened. It generally lives in undisturbed forest, feeding in the canopy on fruits. It has a dark brown face with white streaks, bare black patch round its brown eye, green wings, flanks and tail and red and blue barred breast.

== Behavior ==
The bird nests in holes in trees and stumps. Two to three eggs are normally laid, hatching after approximately 26 days. The young start to fledge in the wild at approximately 10 weeks old. Only two nests have been examined in the wild; both had one chick.

It is not considered threatened, but is listed on CITES Appendix II (as are most parrots not listed on Appendix I).

== Aviculture ==
Red-fan parrots, although not particularly common in aviculture, are sometimes kept as aviary birds or companion parrots. While juvenile birds tend to be docile, adults can be particularly ill-tempered, stubborn, unpredictable and strong-willed birds, showing extreme aggression towards humans and other birds housed with them (including others of their own species and/or their own mates), particularly when in breeding condition. Red-fan parrots, when kept as pets tend to bond with one person and require firm handling and a patient owner, experienced in both bird-keeping and the reading of parrot body language. However, as with all parrots, temperament can vary greatly from individual to individual and some red-fan parrots make excellent companions.

== Gallery ==
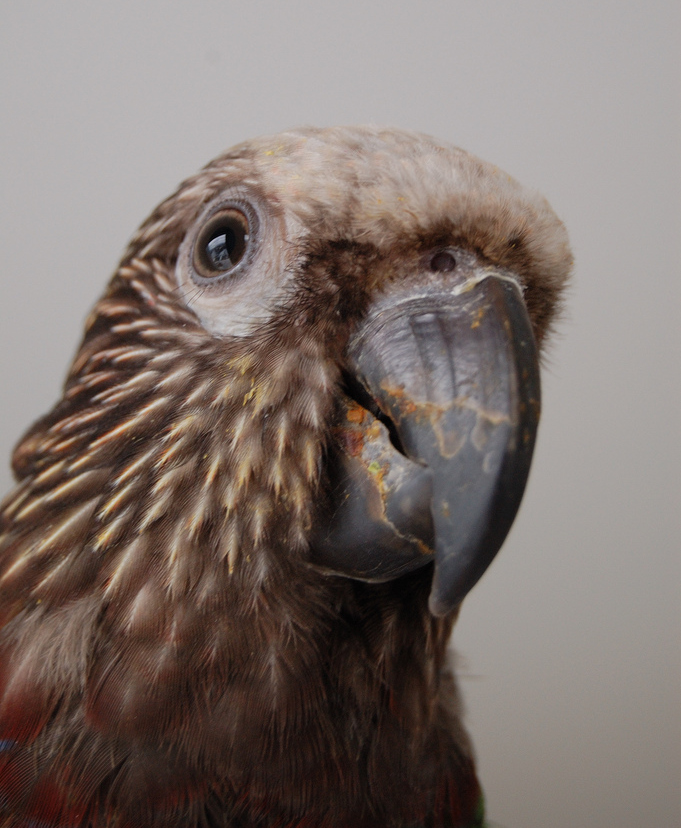

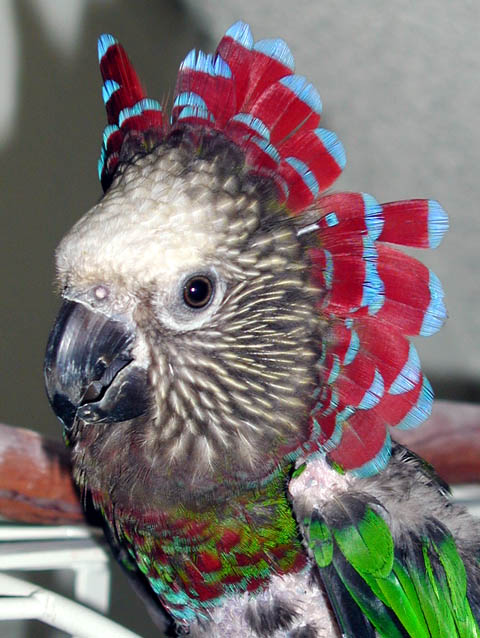
Pet parrot showing its fan

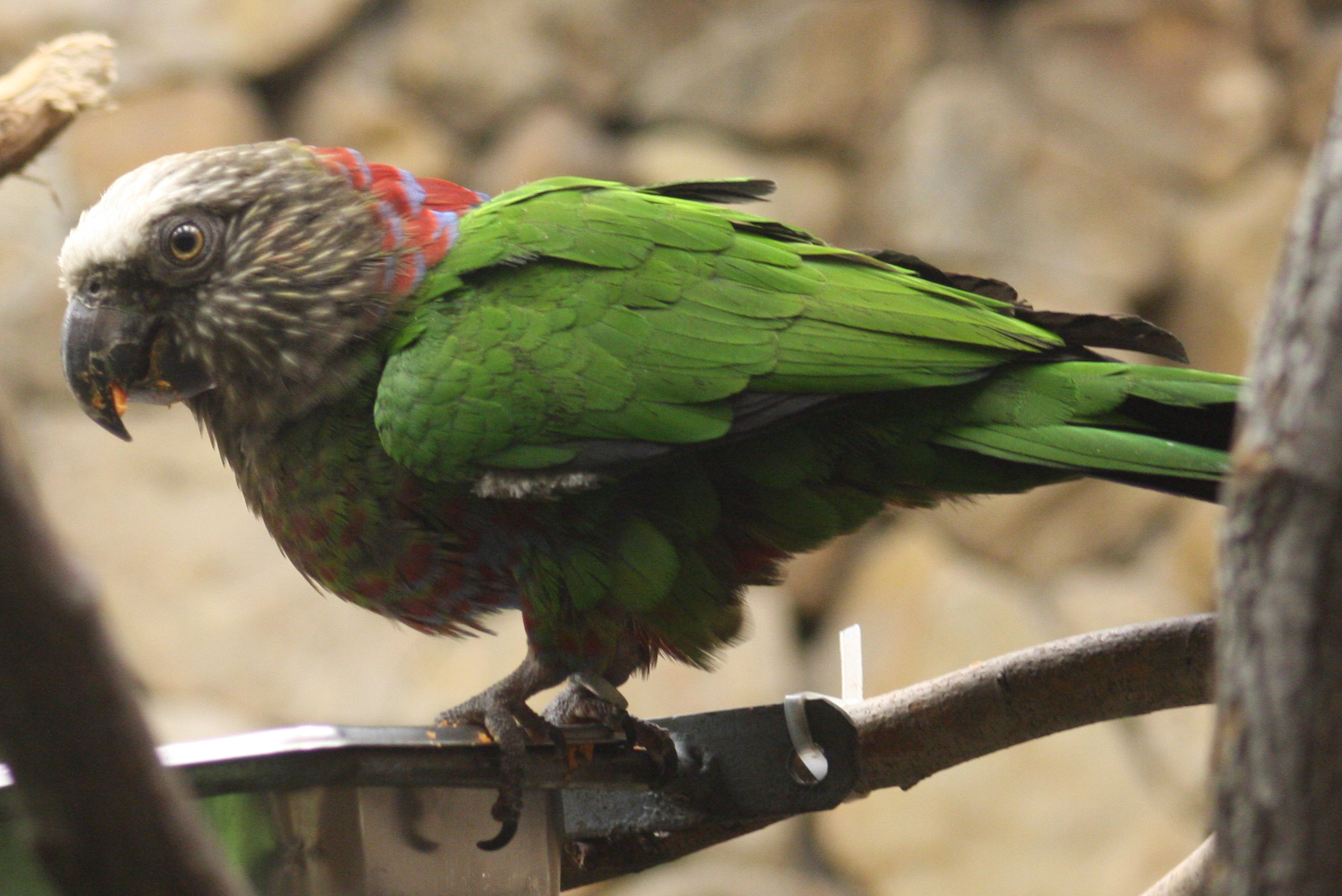
At the National Zoo, United States

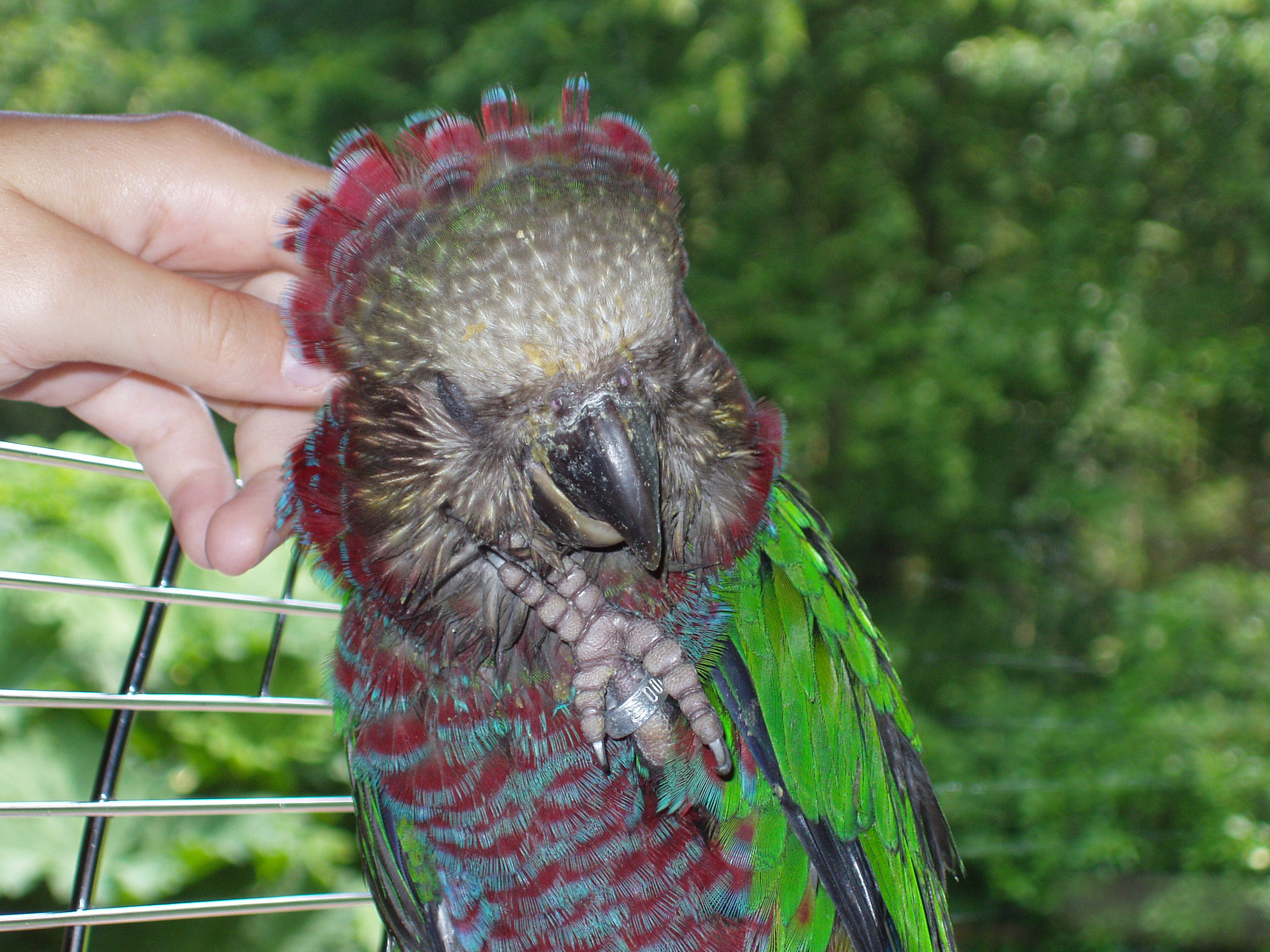
Pet

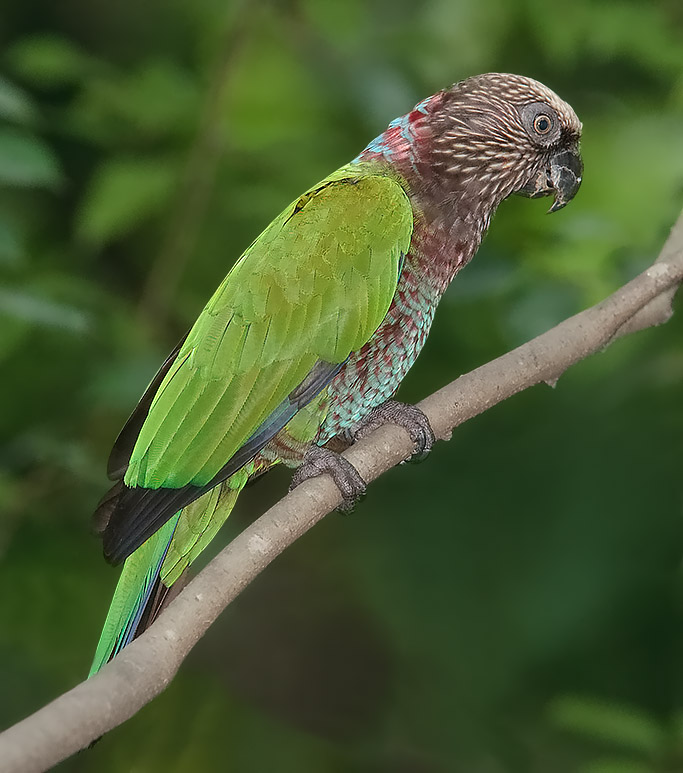

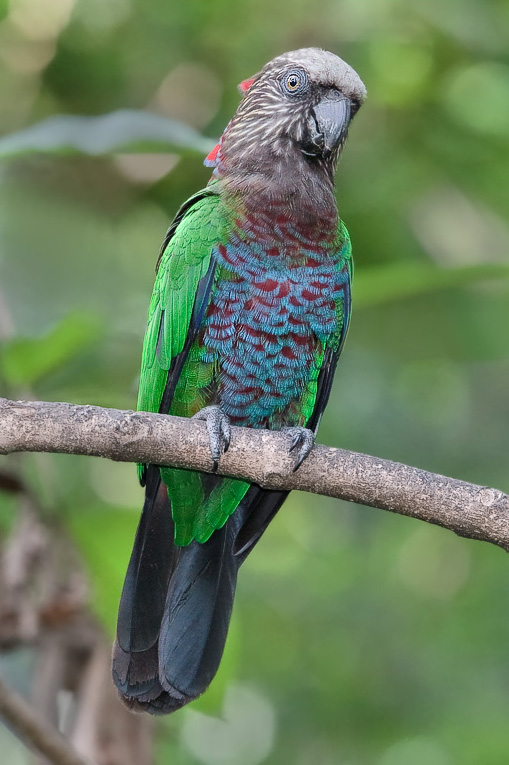

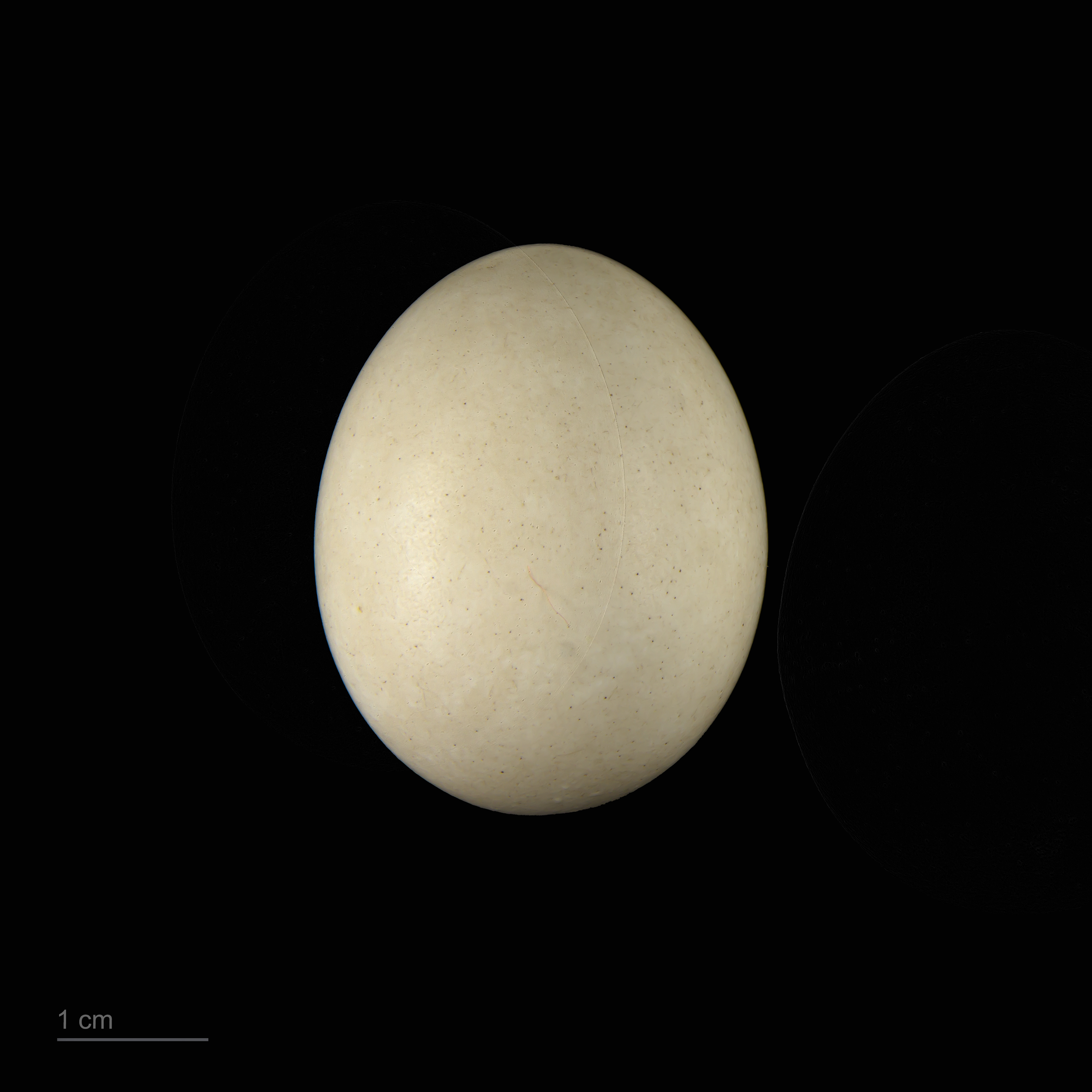
Deroptyus accipitrinus - MHNT
