= Parrot training =

Application of training techniques to modify the behavior of household companion parrots

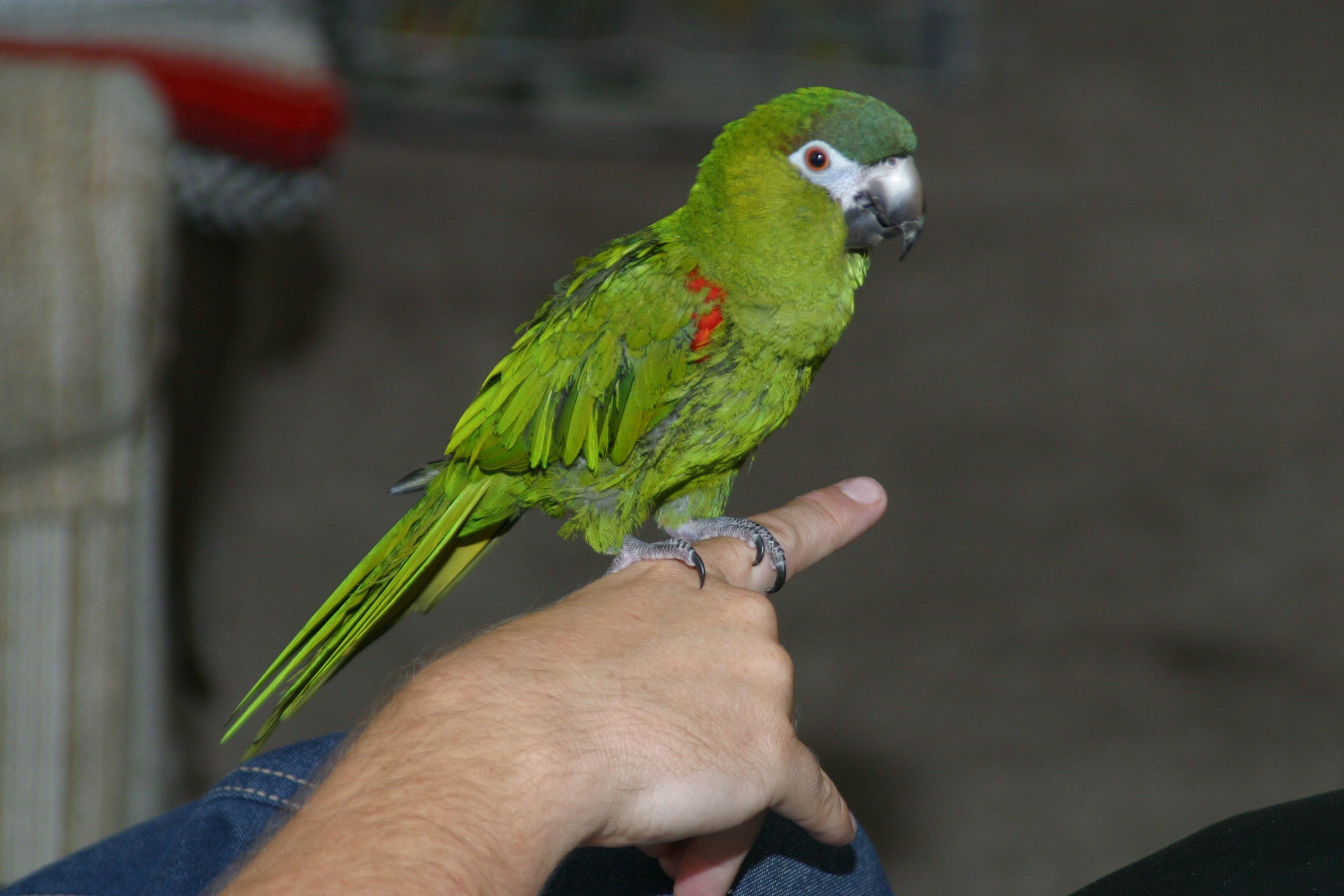
Parrots, like this red-shouldered macaw, can be taught many tricks, such as perching on a finger.

Parrot training, also called parrot teaching, is the application of training techniques to modify the behavior of household companion parrots. Training is used to deal with behavior problems such as biting and screaming, to train husbandry behaviors such as allowing claw trimming without restraint or accepting a parrot harness, and to teach various tricks.

== Parrot psychology ==
Although very trainable and intelligent, parrots are a prey species and are naturally more cautious than predatory species such as dogs. They often must be trained more slowly and carefully. Parrots can, however, eventually be taught many complicated tricks and behaviors, and remember them for years. Parrots are often used in shows at zoos and amusement parks.

Parrots need to socialize. Some behavior problems may be averted through parrot training. As with any animal, training birds also requires patience, time, and commitment with several short sessions each day.

== Taming ==
Parrot taming, or teaching, can be measured by the number, or types of behaviors it knows. Teaching can be achieved through the science behind operant or classical conditioning and is what is currently accepted by the major AZA-accredited zoos and aquariums in the US. If a parrot is exposed to an unusual or mildly aversive stimulus on purpose, such as a new toy or a hand, it can create a fear response very easily in a prey animal such as a bird. Training is at a comfortable pace so the bird accepts the object via small approximations in behavior. Teaching any animal this way prevents flooding and initiation of its fight or flight response.

== Common tricks ==
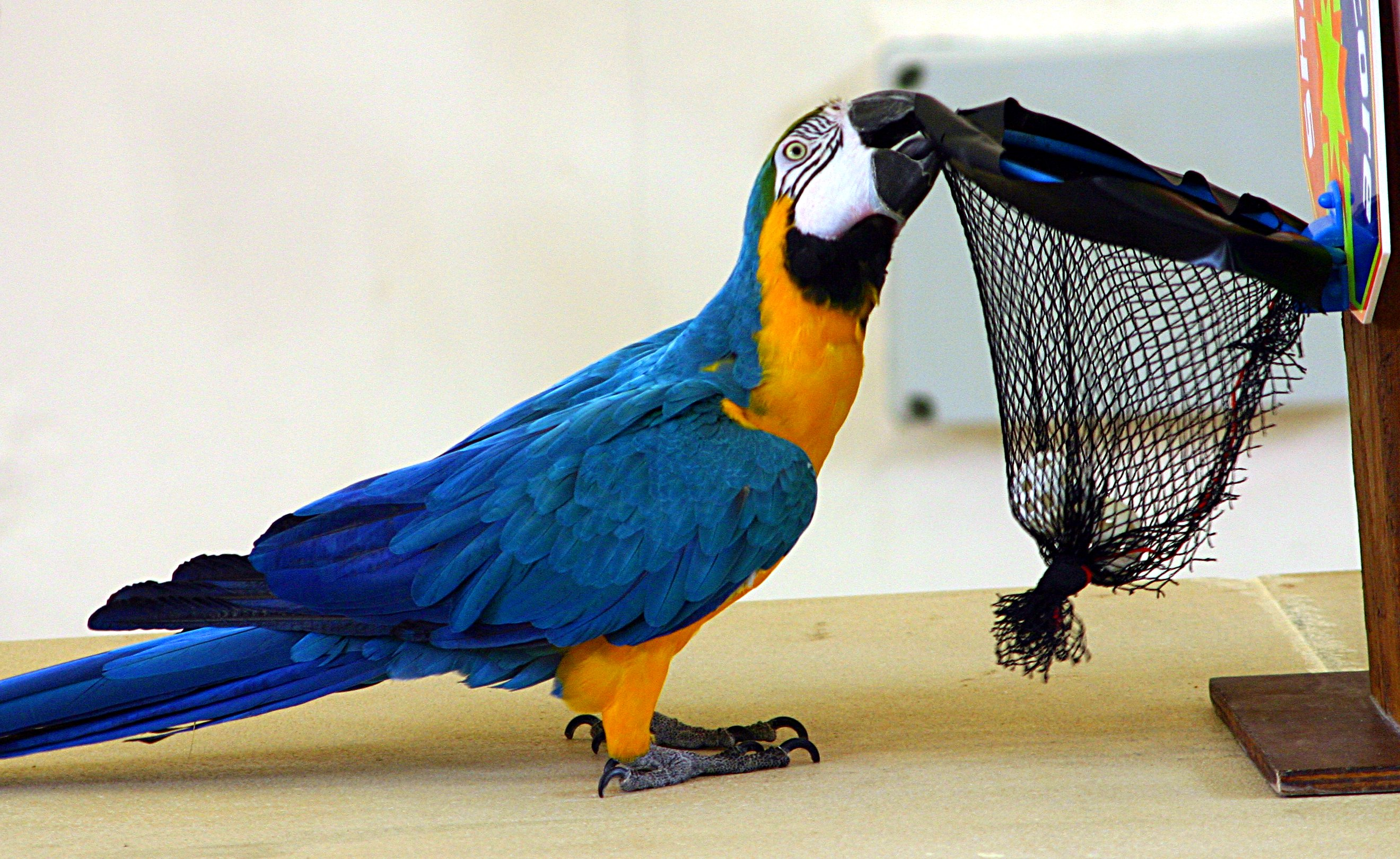
Blue-and-yellow macaw trained to put a ball through a hoop

Tricks commonly taught to pet parrots may include targeting, approaching on command, retrieve, shaking "claws", opening wings, bowing, flying through hoops, flying free outdoors, and talking or singing on command.

== Flight tricks ==
A wide assortment of tricks can be taught which incorporate flight. Recall flight, targeted flight, and the flighted retrieve trick, where the parrot flies to retrieve an object and bring it back. A parrot can fly to retrieve a coin and fly to a different location to drop it in a piggy bank or it can fly to pick up a ball and fly up to a basketball hoop and drop it in.

Flight training a bird to be a reliable flyer requires expertise on the trainer's part. If the trainer is not dedicated to both positive reinforcement and negative punishment training, then problems will occur in the training. Birds may learn to fly away from the owner or new objects as a result of flooding. Trainers who do not rely exclusively on positive reinforcement and negative reinforcement training will often use harnesses on their birds because of the poor training techniques they apply such as grabbing the bird when it does not want to train, snatching the bird out of flight, launching the bird off the hand, and dropping the hand to make a bird fly, all of which increase the fear response in a bird. Harnesses can be a great tool when used properly as a rarely used backup plan to keep the bird safe. If the trainer heavily relies on a harness to keep the bird safe, however, then it is an obvious sign that the training methods used were not positive reinforcement and negative punishment. Trainers who use the harness too much often have problems controlling the bird in an outdoor environment and have problems with birds flying off and not coming back. This problem can be remedied by refining the person's training skills and by eliminating negative reinforcement and positive punishment from the training routine.

== Punishment and negative reinforcement ==
It is not suggested to use positive punishment or negative reinforcement when training, such as spraying a parrot with water or flicking its beak as a way to modify behavior. Such techniques are more likely to cause escape attempts, avoidance, aggression, apathy, generalized fear of the environment, or generalized reduction in behavior, and are not considered good training methods.

Negative reinforcement is commonly used with parrots and involves removing something aversive from the environment that will increase behavior. For example, a rat is placed in a cage and immediately receives a mild electrical shock on its feet. The shock is a negative condition for the rat. The rat presses a bar and the shock stops. The rat receives another shock, presses the bar again, and again the shock stops. The rat's behavior of pressing the bar is strengthened by the consequence of the stopping of the shock. The shock is removed (negative) to increase the behavior (reinforcement) of pressing the lever.

Both positive punishment and negative reinforcement are inherently linked producing similar intensities in undesirable consequences such as escape, avoidance, aggression, apathy, generalized fear of the environment, or generalized reduction in behavior. As in the example with the rat, the shock acts as a positive punisher while the removal of the shock acts as a negative reinforcer which is why the two contingencies are inherently linked. Negative reinforcement cannot be used unless an aversive (the shock) was already applied. Both are discouraged in common trick-training programs.

It has been said that three out of the four contingencies are labeled as aversives, excluding positive reinforcement. Depending on the contingency and the level of severity of the contingency used, side-effects will increase with application. To list the order of which the severity of side-effects intensifies: negative punishment, negative reinforcement, positive punishment. Ergo, when considering a training strategy to produce results with the least amount of aggression, apathy, escape or avoidance, the best choice is negative punishment while the worst is positive punishment.

As a rule, it is easiest to identify a positive punisher and negative reinforcer by the response given by the subject.

== Positive reinforcement ==
Positive training puts the owner in the position of leader. One's parrot will begin looking to him or her for cues on how to behave. By using positive reinforcement and keeping bird training sessions fun, the parrot will try to please its owner to get positive attention as a reward. According to Irene Pepperberg's avian research, pet birds have the intelligence of a three to five-year-old child. They require mental stimulation to remain emotionally healthy, and bird trick-training exercises a bird's brain. Training a parrot with positive reinforcement techniques uses rewards to strengthen or increase the frequency of a behavior.

An example of positive reinforcement training with a companion parrot is to take a parrot who is afraid of stepping up onto its owner's hand and rewarding it with a desired treat when it shows relaxed behavior next to the owner's hand. The parrot would then be rewarded for allowing the hand to come closer, and would be rewarded for stepping up onto the hand. Another example would be for a trainer to wait until a screaming parrot is quiet for a very short time, and then immediately reward it with praise and attention. The owner would then gradually increase the amount of time the parrot must be quiet to receive the extra attention.

With this type of positive reinforcement approach to training (see shaping), the parrot is only rewarded for behaviors that bring it closer to the final desired outcome. For this technique to work effectively, it is common to have to reward a parrot several times for making very small amounts of progress.

Training a parrot with this type of positive reinforcement is the least abrasive approach to training parrots, and often the most effective parrot training technique to use when a companion parrot owner desires to use a training technique that will develop a stronger emotional bond with their parrot.

Positive reinforcement is also very useful for trick training. A desired trick behavior can be shaped gradually, rewarding a parrot for approximations to the desired behavior. Trick training is generally considered to be positive for parrots.

In clicker training, a parrot is taught to associate a click with receiving a reward and is a particularly popular form of positive reinforcement training. In clicker training, the click noise can be used to mark the instant a parrot does the desired behavior, making for more efficient training.

== Counterconditioning ==
Counterconditioning is the process of altering a parrot's behavior to a stimulus by altering the consequence from aversive to positive. If a parrot bites an approaching hand in self-defense, the biting behavior can be counterconditioned by supplementing the approaching hand with positive reinforcement. Instead of biting, the parrot will learn to accept the approaching hand because it is coupled with positive reinforcement.

== Bird flight harness ==
A parrot harness or bird flight harness is a type of pet harness that is specifically designed to be worn by a parrot. It may enable a companion parrot to be taken outdoors while restraining it and preventing it from flying away. Some parrots may dislike wearing a harness and bite at it, but parrots that are harness-trained from a very young age may accept them willingly; more often, though, parrots must be very carefully and gradually accustomed and trained to wear a harness. Care must be taken that the parrot does not feel threatened. Properly trained parrots often appear to enjoy wearing their harnesses if they associate them with going outdoors.

If the harness is attached to a long leash, the parrot can be given some limited flight outside. However, this can be potentially dangerous for the parrot, which may be initially frightened by unfamiliar events, noises, and objects. It is usually best to first take the parrot out in a cage or carrier to let it become accustomed to being outdoors. Parrot harnesses are available commercially in a range of brands and sizes, fitting small birds such as budgerigars and cockatiels, all the way up to the largest macaws and cockatoos. Some parrot owners may choose to make their own harnesses.

Heavy harnesses that require assembly with metal buckles and clips can be uncomfortable. They may be broken or unlatched by some larger birds with strong beaks. A leash should always be fastened securely to the person holding it (such as with an elastic band around the wrist) to prevent dropping it, as a dropped leash may become entangled in a tree or other object if a parrot flies off. A harness should only be used when the parrot is supervised and should never be used to tether a parrot to a perch or other object.

Parrots can be trained to wear a harness using positive and negative reinforcement. Negative reinforcement is used to reward the parrot until it overcomes its fear of the harness. Food treats are used as positive reinforcement to reward the parrot for putting on the harness. A well trained parrot will put the harness on itself by slipping its head through the collar.

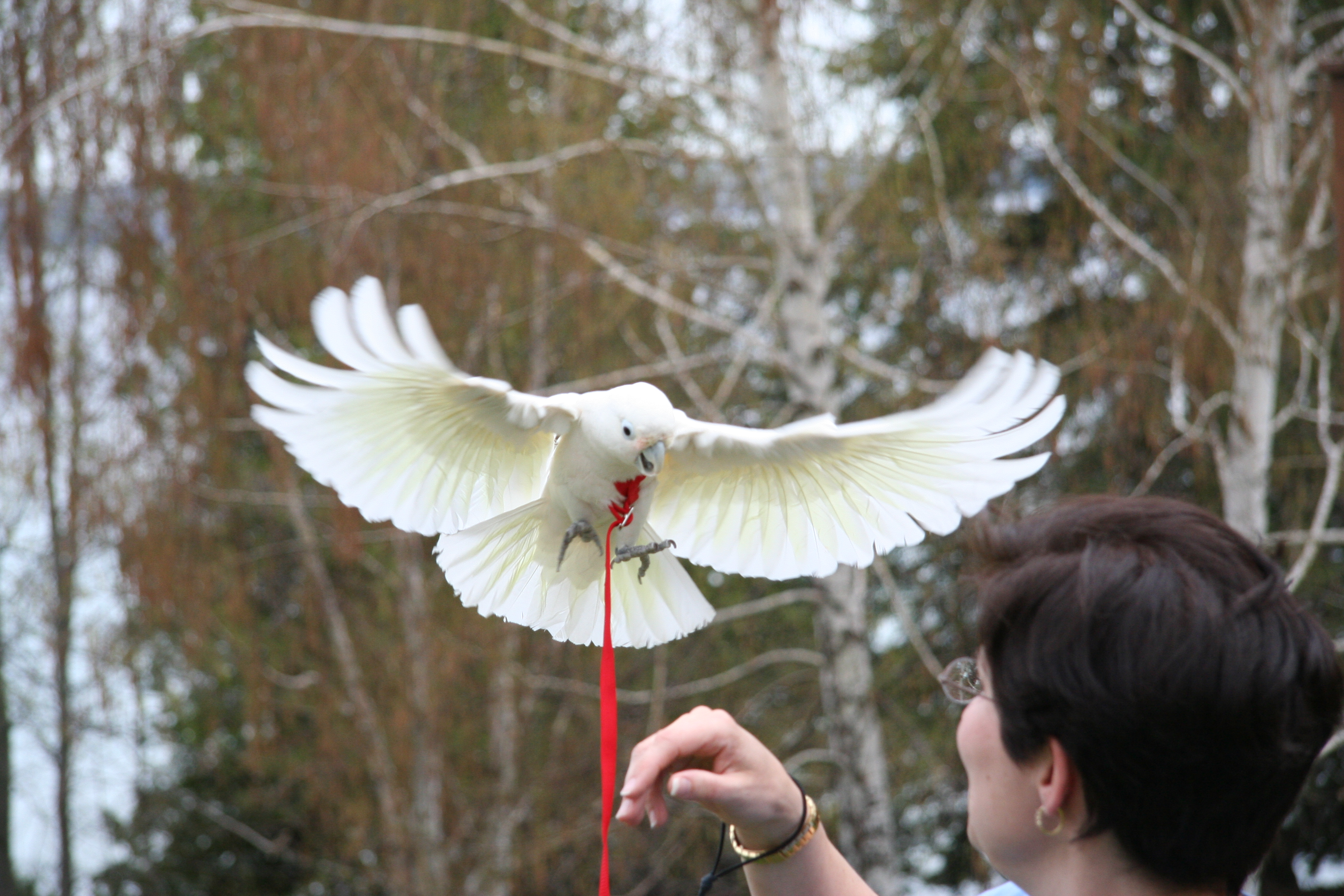
Harnessed Tanimbar corella or Goffin's cockatoo preparing to land

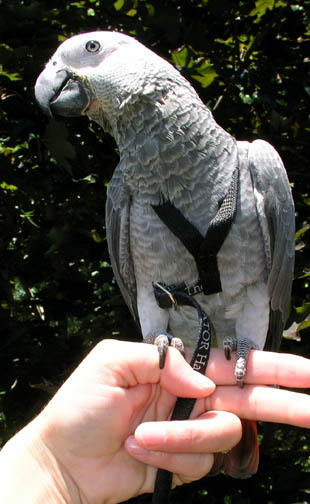
Grey parrot wearing a harness

A harnessed grey parrot flying at Green Island, Taiwan

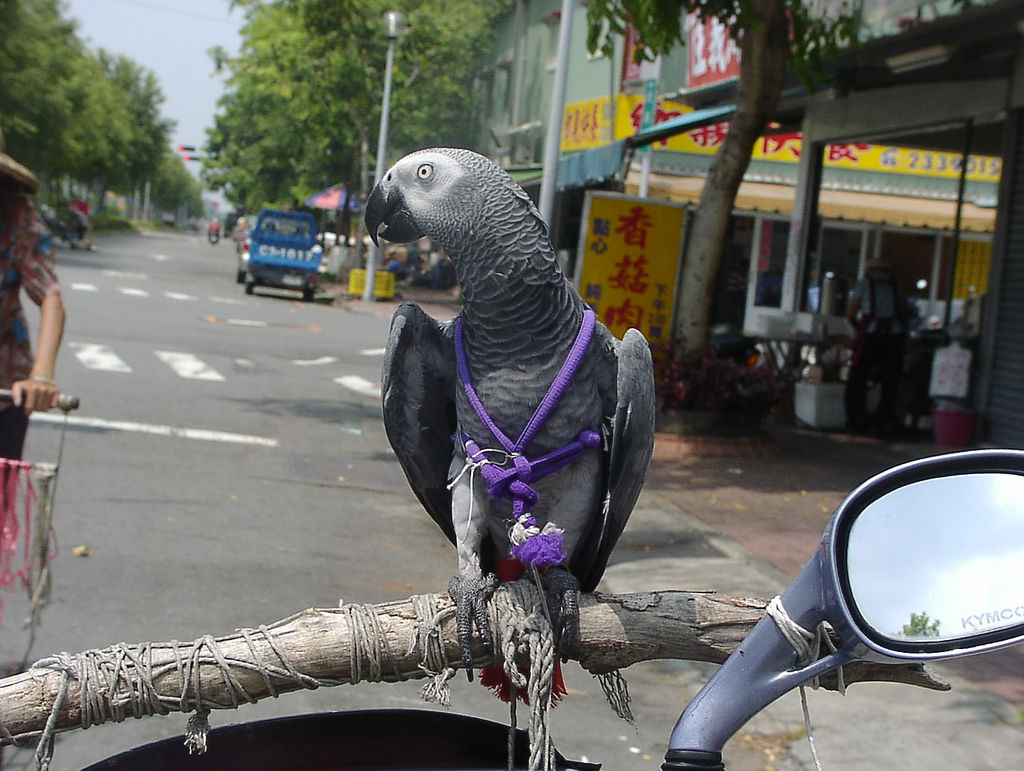
Grey parrot in her harness riding a motorbike in Chiayi, Taiwan June 2005

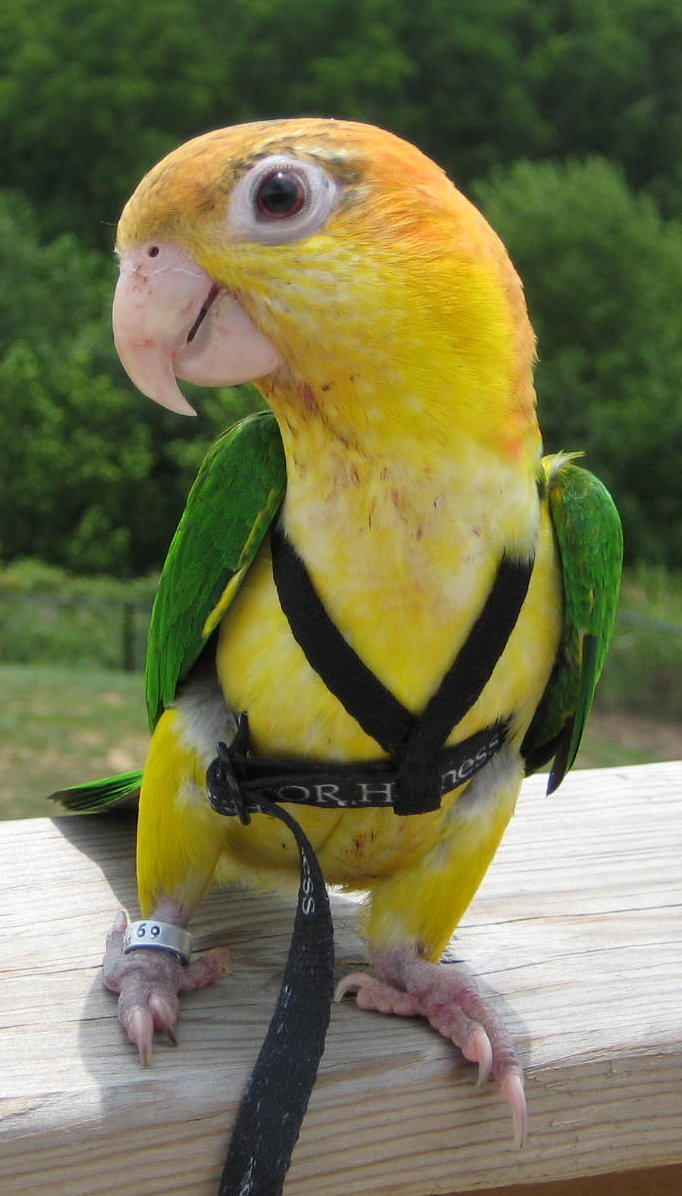
White-bellied caique wearing a flight harness

== See also ==
- Flooding
- Clicker training
- Positive reinforcement
- Punishment

== External sources ==
- The Sequential Psittacine - website about parrots
- Tinkerbell of Taiwan - Living with a flighted parrot at home and how to train and bond together
- Understand the mind of your parrot and how to train and bond together
- Parrot Behaviour Consultants - IAABC
- Feathers, Flight and Parrot Keeping
