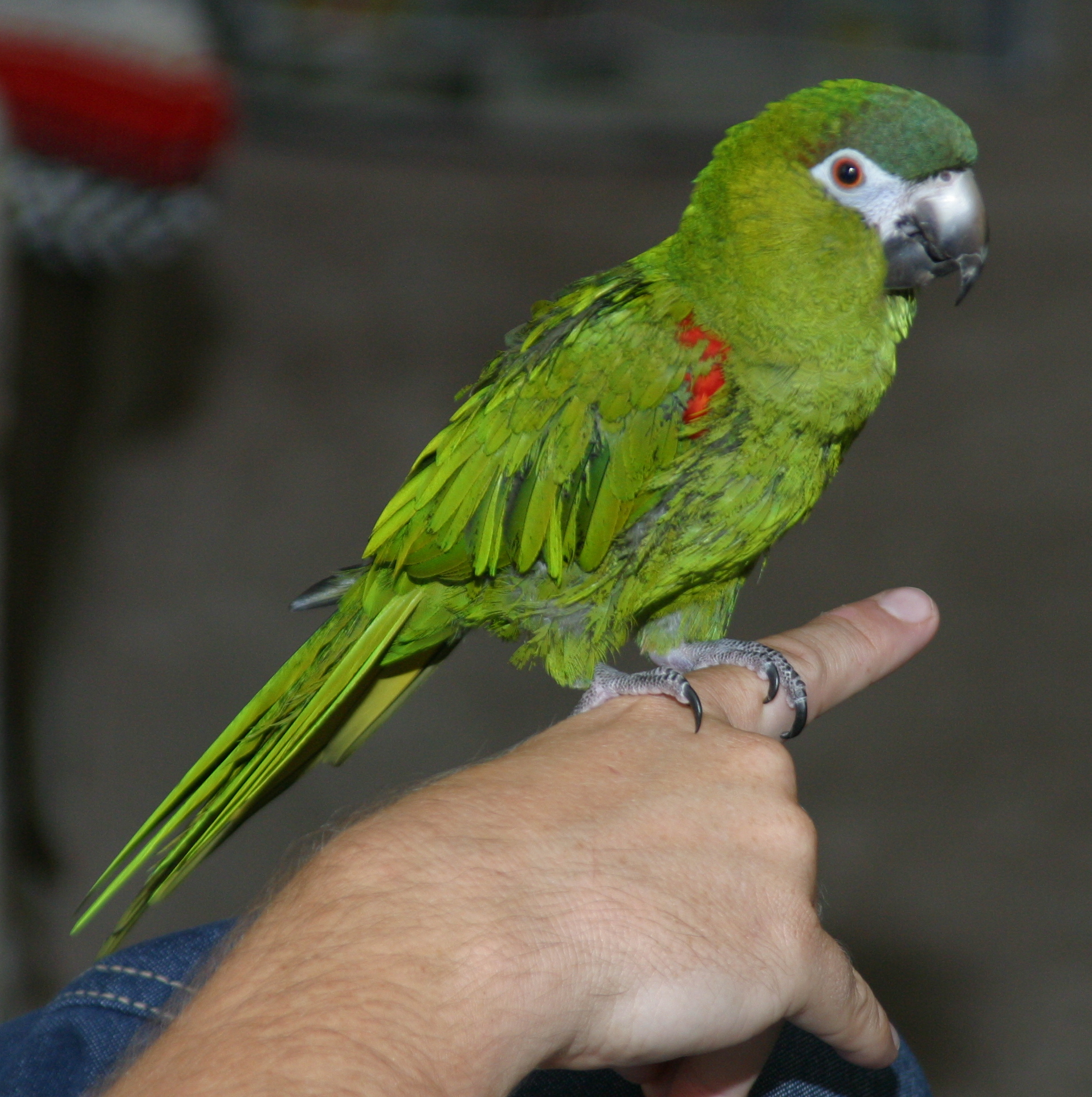
- Hahn's macaw (D. n. nobilis)

Conservation status
- Least Concern (IUCN 3.1)

Scientific classification
- Kingdom: Animalia
- Phylum: Chordata
- Class: Aves
- Order: Psittaciformes
- Family: Psittacidae
- Tribe: Arini
- Genus: Diopsittaca; Ridgway, 1912
- Species: D. nobilis

Binomial name
- Diopsittaca nobilis (Linnaeus, 1758)

Subspecies
- D. n. cumanensis (Lichtenstein 1823); D. n. longipennis Neumann 1931; D. n. nobilis (Linnaeus, 1758)
- Distribution across South America

Synonyms
- Ara nobilis (Linnaeus, 1758); Psittacus nobilis Linnaeus, 1758

= Red-shouldered macaw =

Species of bird

The red-shouldered macaw (Diopsittaca nobilis) is a small green South American parrot, a member of a large group of Neotropical parrots called macaws. The species is named for the red coverts on its wings. It is the smallest macaw, being 30 cm (12 in) in length – similar in size to the Aratinga parakeets. It is native to the tropical lowlands, savannahs, and swamplands of Brazil, the Guianas, Bolivia, Venezuela, and far south-eastern Peru. There are three subspecies: The noble macaw (Diopsittaca nobilis cumanensis), Hahn's macaw (Diopsittaca nobilis nobilis), and the long-winged macaw (Diopsittaca nobilis longipennis). The long-winged macaw is a poorly distinct third subspecies that has longer wings, but is otherwise similar to the noble macaw. The Hahn's subspecies is named for German zoologist Carl-Wilhelm Hahn, who in 1834 began compiling Ornithologischer Atlas oder naturgetreue Abbildung und Beschreibung der aussereuropäischen Vögel (Engl: Ornithological Atlas or natural depiction and description of birds from outside Europe).

Red-shouldered macaws are frequently bred in captivity for the pet trade, where they are sometimes described as mini-macaws.

Though wild populations of red-shouldered macaws have declined locally due to habitat loss, they are listed as Least Concern by IUCN. They are listed on Appendix II of CITES, and trade is restricted.

== Taxonomy ==
The red-shouldered macaw was formally described in 1758 by the Swedish naturalist Carl Linnaeus in the tenth edition of his Systema Naturae. He placed it with all the other parrots in the genus Psittacus and coined the binomial name Psittacus nobilis. The red-shouldered macaw is now the only species placed in the genus Diopsittaca, which was introduced in 1912 by the American ornithologist Robert Ridgway. The genus name combines the Ancient Greek dios, "noble" with psittakē, meaning "parrot". The specific epithet noblilis is Latin meaning "noble". There are two distinct subspecies, D. n. nobilis (Hahn's macaw) and D. n. cumanensis (noble macaw), and some with longer wings might represent a poorly differentiated subspecies, D. n. longipennis, which intergrades with D. n. cumanensis in central Goiás, Brazil. The species is sometimes subsumed into the genus Ara.

Taxonomy proposed by BirdLife International splits the red-shouldered macaw into two species.

- Northern red-shouldered macaw (Diopsittaca nobilis)
- Southern red-shouldered macaw (Diopsittaca cumanensis)

== Description ==
The red-shouldered macaw, at 30 cm (12 in) long and 165 g (5.8 oz), is the smallest of all the macaws. Like all macaws, it has a long narrow tail and a large head. It has bright green feathers on the body, with dark or slate blue feathers on the head just above the beak. The wings and tail have feathers that are bright green above and olive-green below. The leading edges of the wings, especially on the underside, are red. (These red feathers appear at puberty.) Their eyes are orange, and the skin around the eyes is white without feathers, just as in the larger macaws. This bare patch of facial skin is smaller in proportion to the head than the one seen in most larger macaws. The Hahn's macaw and noble macaw can be distinguished by the upper mandible, which is black in the Hahn's macaw and horn-colored in the noble macaw.

Their natural vocalizations are more akin to screeches than they are to whistles.

== Behavior ==
Red-shouldered macaws are very kind-natured, similar to the large macaws.

=== Breeding ===
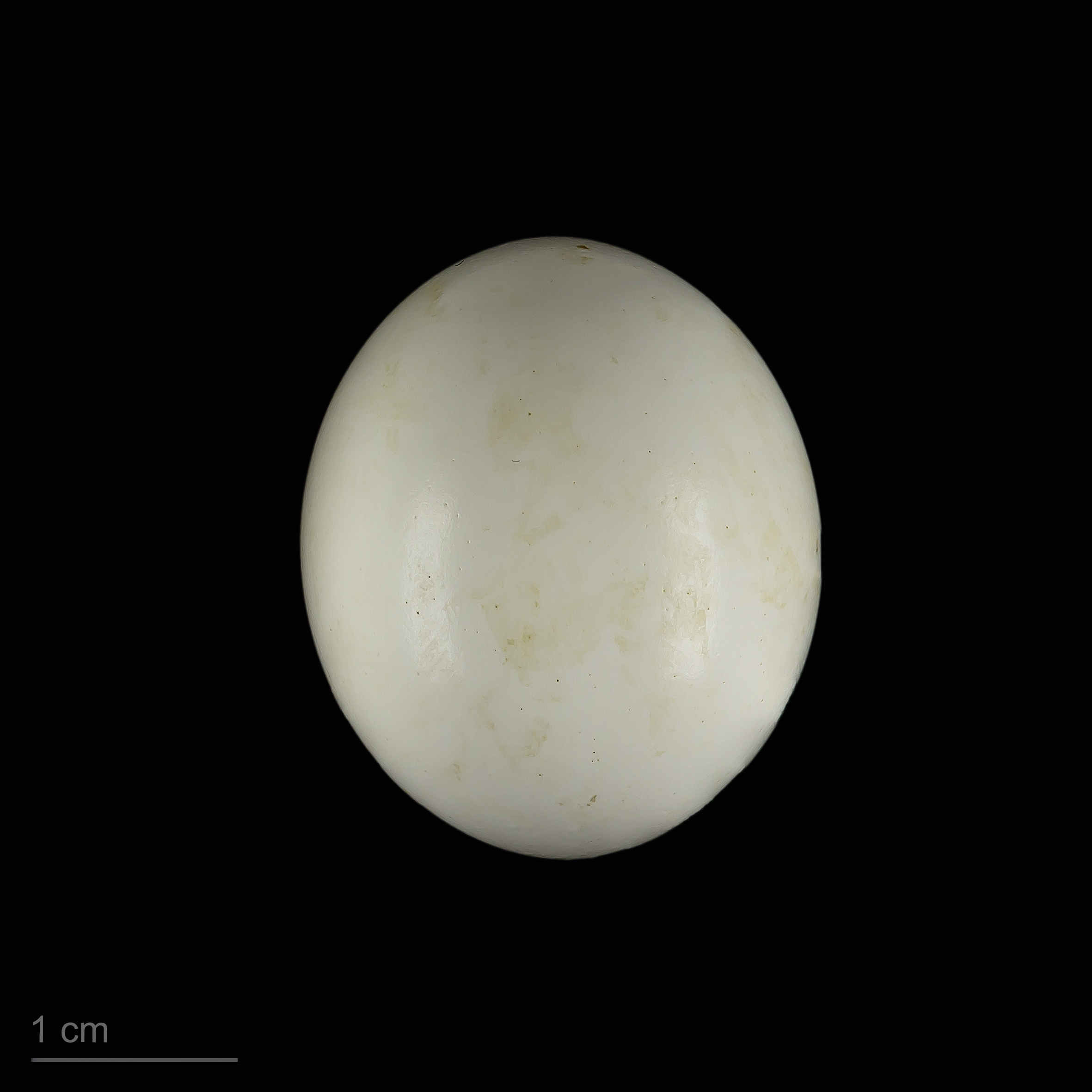
Diopsittaca nobilis (MHNT)

The red-shouldered macaw nests in a hole in a tree. There are usually three or four white eggs in a clutch. The female incubates the eggs for about 24 to 26 days, and the chicks fledge from the nest about 54 days after hatching.

== Aviculture ==
Despite having a reputation as a noisy bird, the red-shouldered macaw is said to be excellent pet, although it is not recommended for apartment living. If properly socialized, it is typically a gentle, intelligent bird that bonds well with humans and gets along well with well-behaved children. In addition, it is supposedly an excellent talker that can be taught many tricks. It may be a more suitable pet parrot for those who lack the space in their homes for a larger macaw, although it requires daily exercise outside of its cage. It is also recommended by the World Parrot Trust that this parrot should have access to an outside enclosure for at least part of the year. The red-shouldered macaw can live for 25–40 years in captivity.

== Gallery ==
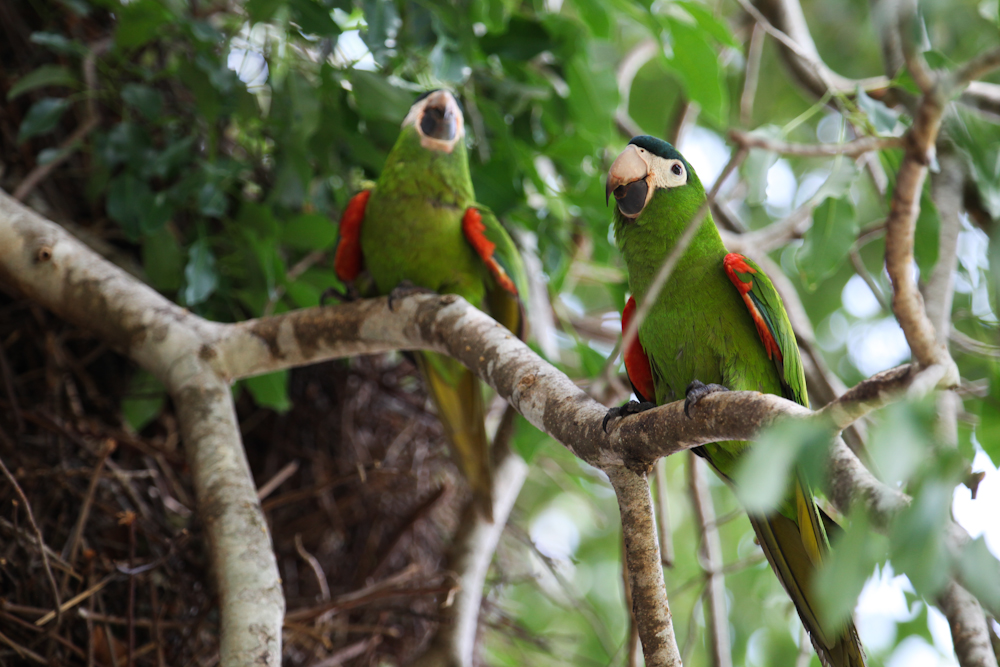
Noble macaws in Mato Grosso, Brazil

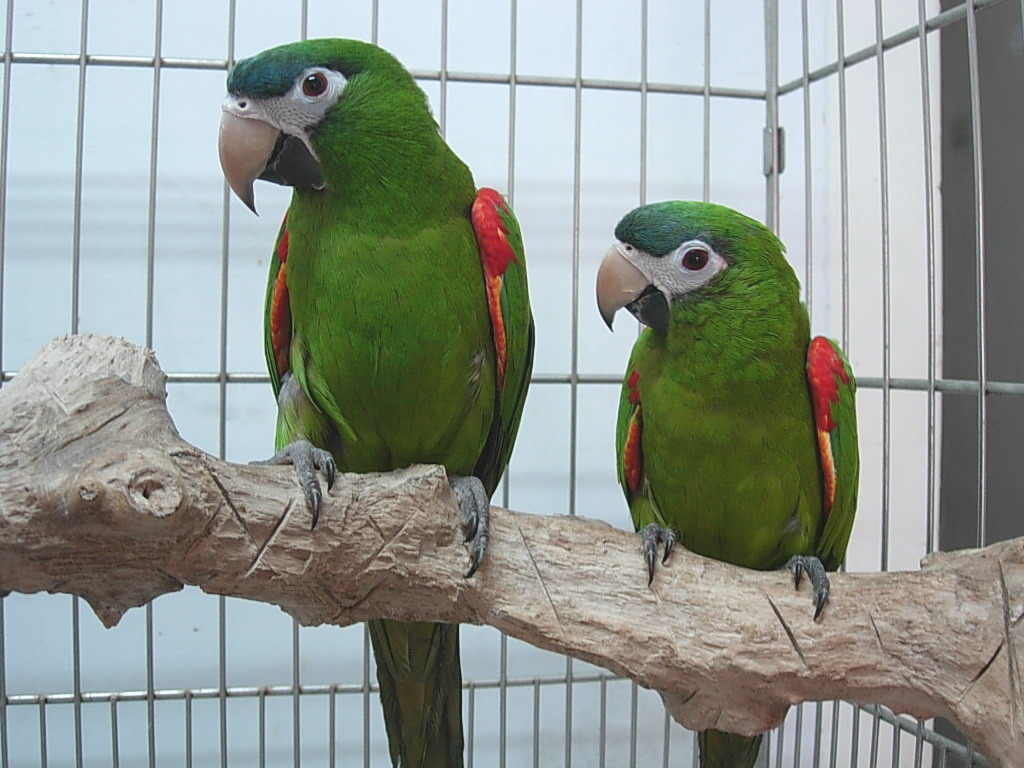
A pair of noble macaws in captivity

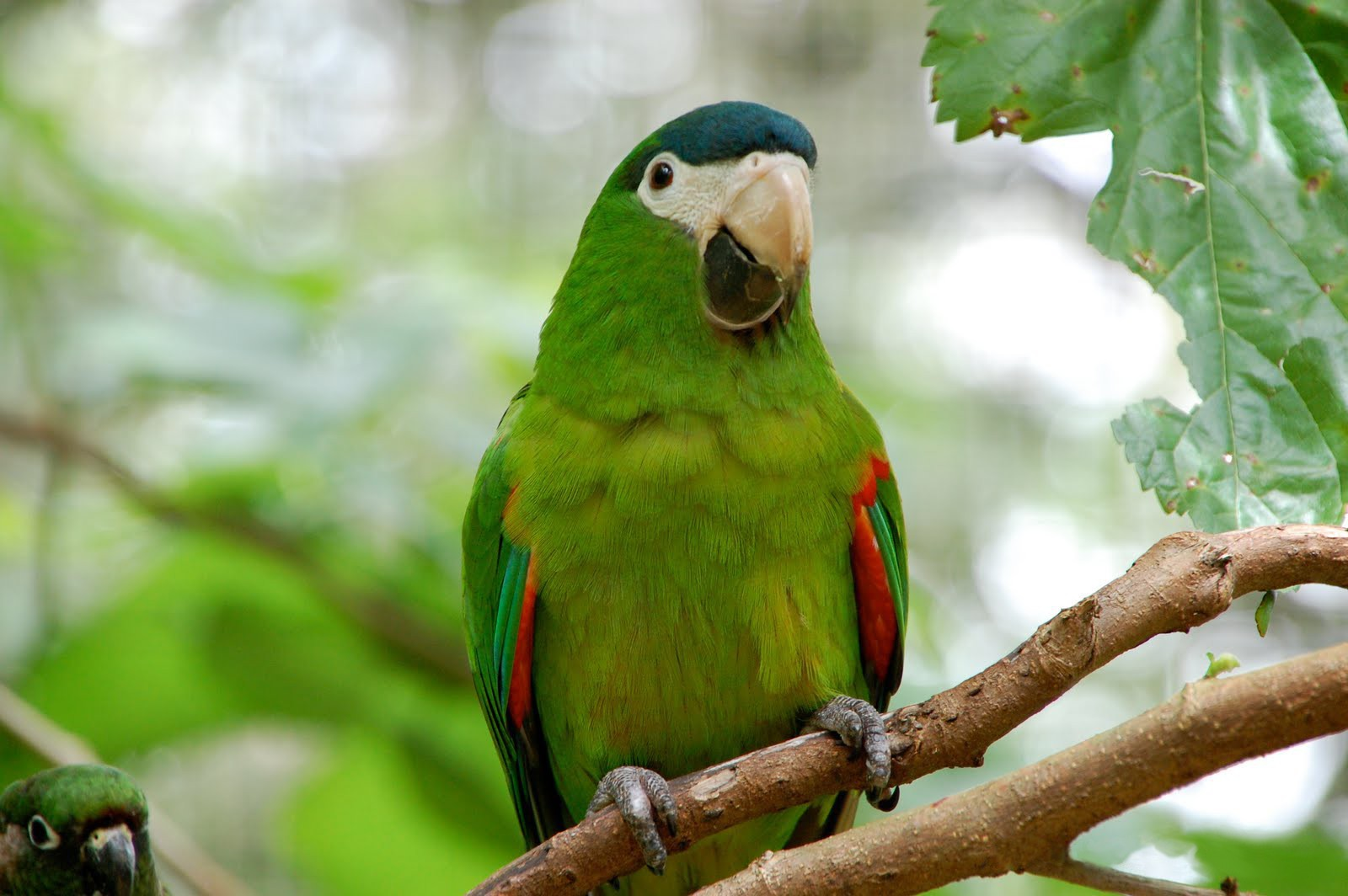
Noble macaw at Parque das Aves, Foz do Iguaçu, Brazil

== Cited texts ==
- Forshaw, Joseph M. (2006). Parrots of the World; an Identification Guide. Illustrated by Frank Knight. Princeton University Press. ISBN 0-691-09251-6.
