= Chronic egg laying =

Behavioural disorder in birds

Chronic egg laying is a maladaptive, behavioural disorder commonly seen in pet birds which repeatedly lay clutches of infertile eggs in the absence of a mate. It is particularly common in cockatiels, budgerigars, lovebirds, macaws and amazon parrots. Birds exhibiting chronic egg laying behavior will frequently lay eggs one after the other without stopping to brood them once the typical clutch size for their particular species has been reached. Excessive egg laying places a strain on the hen's body, depleting resources such as calcium, protein and vitamins from her body and may lead to conditions such as egg binding, osteoporosis, seizures, prolapse of the oviduct, or peritonitis – which may lead to her death.

== Causes ==
While a single specific cause is unknown, chronic egg laying is believed to be triggered by hormonal imbalances influenced by a series of external factors. As in the domestic chicken, female parrots are capable of producing eggs without the involvement of a male – it is a biological process that may be triggered by environmental cues such as day length (days becoming longer, indicating the arrival of spring) and food availability, or the presence of a dark, enclosed space (such as a cupboard or space beneath furniture) in which the bird in question can hide and is not a conscious decision. An overabundance of easily available, nutritious food may trigger the bird's reproductive cycle, as can the presence of a male bird in the vicinity of her cage, or even a circumstance where the hen becomes mistakenly attracted to a mirror or other cage toy. Removing the eggs from a bird demonstrating this behavior may make the problem worse by inducing her to lay even more eggs. It is also possible for the bird's owner to inadvertently trigger chronic egg laying by regularly petting her on the back or under the wings or feeding her from the mouth, which the bird may misinterpret as courtship behaviour.

== Treatment ==
Unlike cats, dogs, and other pet mammals, parrots are not routinely neutered. Although it is possible to spay a female parrot, it is a difficult and dangerous procedure that is seldom performed except in extreme circumstances. Instead, treatment and prevention of chronic egg laying behavior involves behavioral modification and environmental changes.

Such changes may include:

- Shortening the parrot's perceived day length by putting her to bed early, giving her 12 hours of uninterrupted sleep
- Denying her access to dark, enclosed spaces
- Separating her from any birds to which she appears to be bonded in a sexual manner
- Discouraging sexual behaviors from the bird towards humans or favored objects
- Regularly changing around the layout of her cage
- Permitting the bird to continue sitting on her eggs until she loses interest if she has already laid a clutch and then stopped

Hormonal treatment, such as injection of leuprolide acetate (Lupron) or a deslorelin implant placed beneath the skin, may cause the egg-laying to cease, but does not resolve the underlying cause of the behavior.
