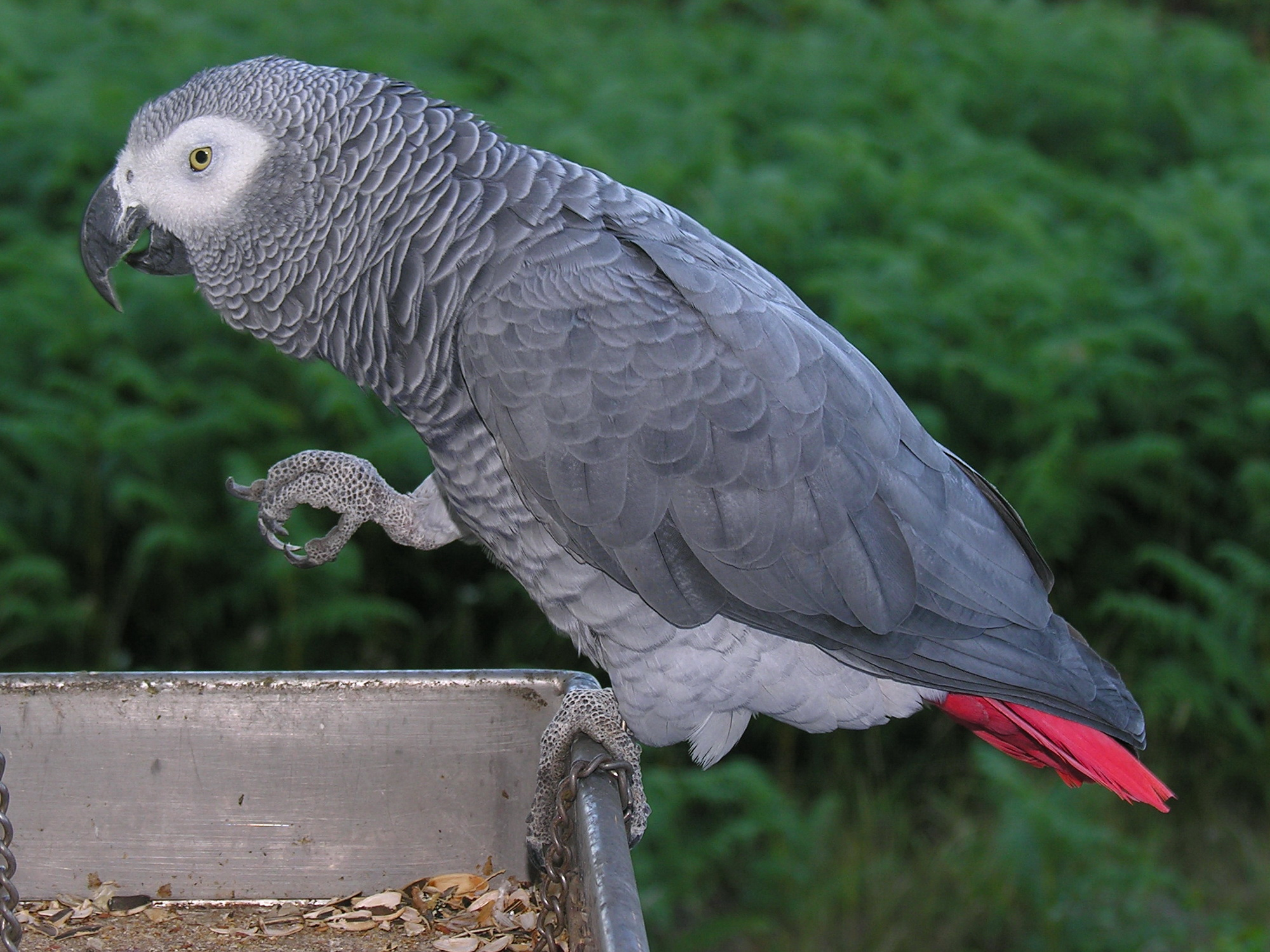
- Grey parrot
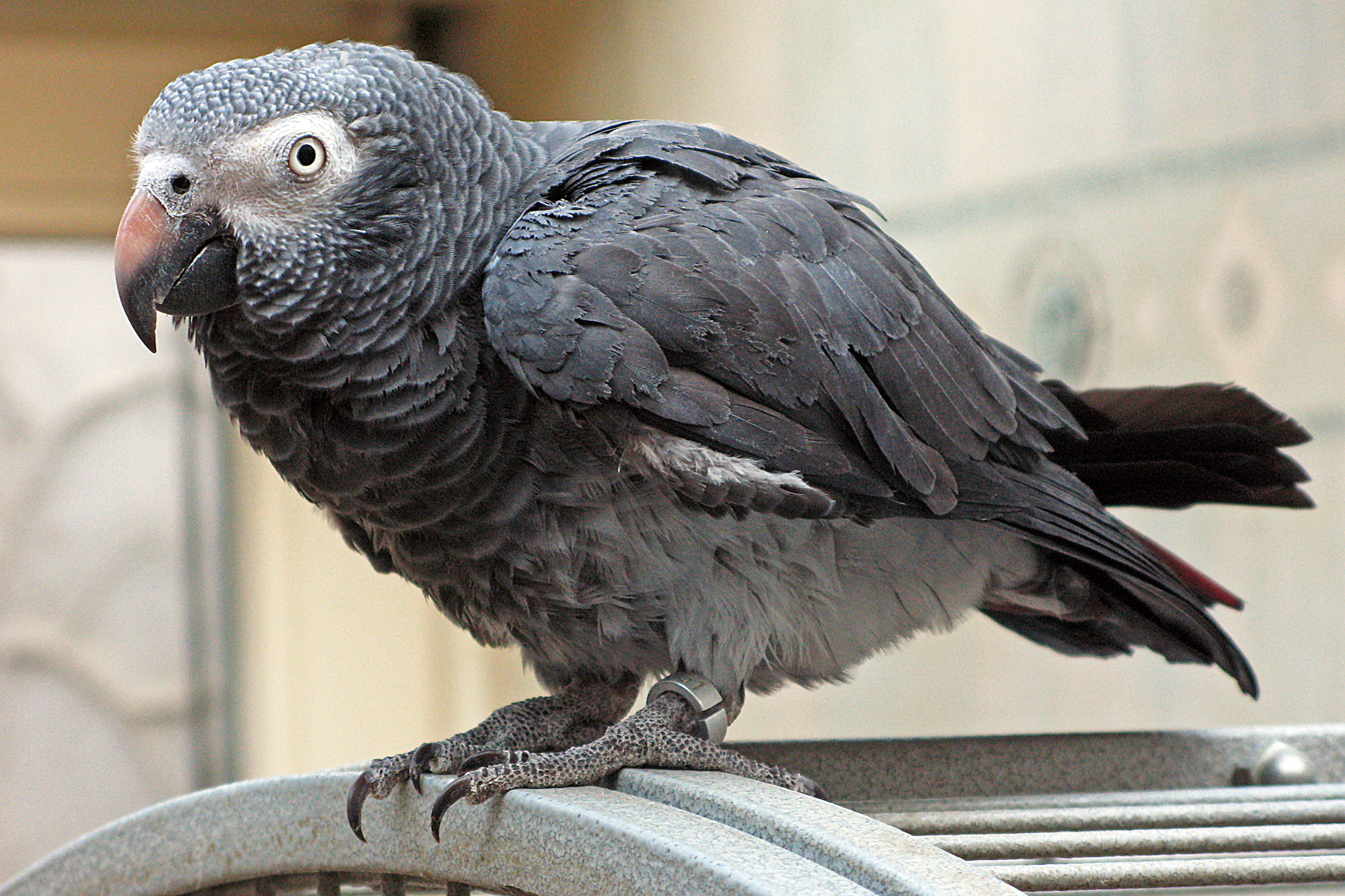
- Timneh parrot

Scientific classification
- Kingdom: Animalia
- Phylum: Chordata
- Class: Aves
- Order: Psittaciformes
- Family: Psittacidae
- Subfamily: Psittacinae
- Genus: Psittacus; Linnaeus, 1758

Type species
- Psittacus erithacus (grey parrot) Linnaeus, 1758

Species
- P. erithacus; P. timneh

= Psittacus =

Genus of birds

Psittacus (African grey parrots) is a genus of parrots in the subfamily Psittacinae. It contains two species, the grey parrot (Psittacus erithacus) and the Timneh parrot (Psittacus timneh).

For many years, the grey parrot and Timneh parrot were classified as subspecies; the former as the nominate, the latter as P. e. timneh. However, in 2012 the taxa were concluded to be separate species by BirdLife International on the basis of genetic, morphological, plumage and vocal differences; the IOC World Bird List adopted the split in 2014.

These parrots are found in the primary and secondary rainforest of West and Central Africa. They are among the most intelligent birds in the world. They feed primarily on palm nuts, seeds, fruit, and leafy matter, but have also been observed eating snails. Their inclination and ability to mimic speech and other sounds have made them popular pets.

== Taxonomy ==
The genus Psittacus was introduced in 1758 by the Swedish naturalist Carl Linnaeus in the tenth edition of his Systema Naturae. The genus name is Latin for "parrot". Linnaeus included all 37 of the then-known parrots in the genus, and of these George Robert Gray designated the grey parrot (Psittacus erithacus) as the type species.

=== Species ===
The genus now contains only two species:

Genus Psittacus – Linnaeus, 1758 – two species
Common name	Scientific name and subspecies	Range	Size and ecology	IUCN status and estimated population
Grey parrot	Psittacus erithacus Linnaeus, 1758	From southeastern Ivory Coast to western Kenya (where restricted to Kakamega Forest, with only 10 birds left), northwest Tanzania, southern Democratic Republic of the Congo (DRC), and northern Angola.	Size: This is the nominate species, and at 28–39 cm (11–15 in) long, larger than the Timneh parrot, with light grey feathers, cherry-red tails, and an all-black beak. Immatures have tails with a darker, duller red towards the tip until their first moult, which occurs by 18 months old. These birds also initially have grey irises, which change to a pale yellow by the time the bird is a year old. Habitat: Diet:	EN
Timneh parrot	Psittacus timneh Fraser, 1844 Two subspecies: P. t. timneh Fraser, 1844; P. t. princeps Alexander, 1909	Nominate P. t. timneh is endemic to the western parts of the moist Upper Guinea forests and bordering savannas of West Africa from Guinea-Bissau, Sierra Leone, and southern Mali east to at least 70 km (43 mi) east of the Bandama River in Ivory Coast. Subspecies P. t. princeps occurs on the island of Príncipe.	Size: The Timneh parrot is slightly smaller in size than the grey parrot, ranging from 22–28 cm (9–11 in) length. It has darker charcoal-grey plumage, a darker maroon tail, and a light, horn-coloured area on part of the upper mandible. In 2012, BirdLife International gave the Timneh parrot full species status and it was classified as vulnerable. Habitat: Diet:	EN

== Behaviour and ecology ==
=== Breeding ===
Psittacus parrots are monogamous breeders which nests in tree cavities. The female lays 3-5 eggs, which she incubates for 30 days while being fed by her mate. Young leave the nest at the age of 12 weeks. Little is known about the courtship behaviour of this species in the wild.

=== Longevity ===
Like many large parrots, they are long-lived birds. The Animal Ageing and Longevity Database states the longest reliably recorded longevity for the species in captivity as 49.7 years. Also acknowledged are claims of captive grey parrots reaching the ages of 73 and 93, whereas the World Parrot Trust lists a longevity of 50–60 years for a grey in captivity. The Guinness Book of World Records listed a grey parrot that allegedly lived in captivity for 72 years as the longest-lived specimen for the species.

=== Illness and disease ===
Grey parrots have been known at times to contract a non-infectious inflammatory lung disease called lipid pneumonia. Lipid pneumonia can be classified as exogenous or endogenous depending on whether or not the animal inhaled outside material. A necropsy shows that the lungs of a grey parrot with endogenous lipid pneumonia (EnLP) are firm with a diffuse grey discoloration. EnLP is a common illness in other animals as well. The grey parrot is also one of the three parrots that scientists found to commonly suffer from dehydration. Scientists have used plasma osmolality to find more information about the form of dehydration grey parrots have. Another disease that the grey parrots get is cardiomyopathy, which is a heart disease usually presented at a young age. The cause is having parents of the same breed. Some other common symptoms in these birds are weakness, coelomic cavity, and retardation. The grey parrot has been known to contract beak and feather disease virus (BFDV) which causes a highly contagious, and sometimes fatal, psittacine beak and feather disease in parrots. In a PCR-based study, Chlamydiosis, an infectious disease of avians, was found to infect the grey parrot. In the study 253 clinical samples were taken from 27 bird species belonging to seven orders. Thirty-two (12.6%) samples were positive for Chlamydi and two new genotypes were discovered, Chlamydophila psittaci and Chlamydophila abortus. Another ailment that grey parrots commonly suffer from is hypocalcemic-induced seizure activity. Birds between 2–15 years of age contract it, due to a lack of calcium. A symptom of the syndrome can be unsteadiness while standing or falling off a perch along with neurological anomalies or problems.

=== Intelligence ===
Birds appear to offer, in their behavior, neurophysiology, and neuroanatomy a striking case of parallel evolution of consciousness. Evidence of near human-like levels of consciousness has been most dramatically observed in African grey parrots.

— The Cambridge Declaration on Consciousness

Irene Pepperberg's research with captive greys, most notably with a bird named Alex, has scientifically demonstrated that they possess the ability to associate simple human words with meanings, and to intelligently apply the abstract concepts of shape, colour, number, zero-sense, etc. According to Pepperberg and other ornithologists, they perform many cognitive tasks at the level of dolphins, chimpanzees, and even human toddlers. As well as labeling objects, Alex could verbally express what his wants were, suggesting that grey parrots know the difference between features and feelings. In general, it has been shown that grey parrots are able to learn relatively quickly, though they are limited to simple and non-abstract mediums of thinking. They have been shown to be able to make cognitive inferences, but, like apes, have inter-individual differences in intelligence. For example, in one experiment involving food hidden under cups, it was shown that greys can identify where the food is, usually if shown its original location at first.

Pet greys may learn to speak within their first year, but many do nor say their first word until 12–18 months old. Timnehs are generally observed to start speaking earlier, some in their late first year. Both subspecies seem to have the same ability and tendency to produce human speech, but vocal ability and proclivity may range widely among individual birds. Grey parrots tend to use more specific calls for different species coming their way which can be known as stimulus specificity, since there is a stimulus vocalization the birds have.

A study published in 2011, led by Dalila Bovet of Paris West University Nanterre La Défense, demonstrated grey parrots were able to coordinate and collaborate with each other to an extent. They were able to solve problems set by scientists—for example, two birds could pull strings at the same time to obtain food. In another example, one bird stood on a perch to release a food-laden tray, while the other pulled the tray out from the test apparatus. Both would then feed. The birds in question were observed waiting for their partners to perform the necessary actions so their behaviour could be synchronised. The parrots appeared to express individual preferences as to which of the other test birds they would work with.

In an experiment about local enhancement in grey parrots, food was visibly hidden under two separate cups. The experimenter then lifted the first cup and either removed what was under it or put it back. This was then done again in several different combinations, the cups were lifted in a different order and the food was removed or put back in a different order. Instead of remembering which cup had the food, the birds would show preference to the one that was touched last.

Another series of experiments further tested grey parrots' cognitive abilities. In general, most animals cannot associate sounds with objects, such as food, placed into a cup. While originally only the great apes and young human children were known to make this association with ease, it was found that grey parrots, under most conditions, can also associate sounds with the presence of an object. For the most part, grey parrots performed more successfully if the cup was shaken horizontally before it is given the choice of selecting which contained food; however, further experimentation indicated that it is not a requirement and proved that grey parrots have very high cognitive abilities.

=== Vocal behaviour ===
Wild grey parrots often whistle, click, or make other sounds. Captive birds may make regular renditions of microwave ovens, telephones, alarm clocks, video games, and other electronic sounds, as well as dripping water, wild birds, and any other sound often heard by the parrot. Greys have even been known to repeat profanities they heard from an owner even after they no longer live with that owner. Greys also have the ability to mimic, and distinguish between, the different voices they hear. Grey parrots use different alarm calls for different predators coming their way.

Shrieking and clicking of the grey parrot

In an experiment to test the vocalisations of grey parrots, four bred in captivity were placed in an aviary. Throughout the day they spent time in a room with toys and came into fairly regular contact with the humans taking care of them. The noises that these parrots could hear consisted of the calls of canaries in the laboratory, people cleaning, doors squeaking, etc. In the next 3 years, the parrots made over 50,000 vocalisations. What was interesting was that, although they were bred in captivity, the sounds they made were not only ones of their immediate surroundings. They also made calls similar to those of other captive grey parrots in different locations and even wild grey parrots.

== Status and conservation ==
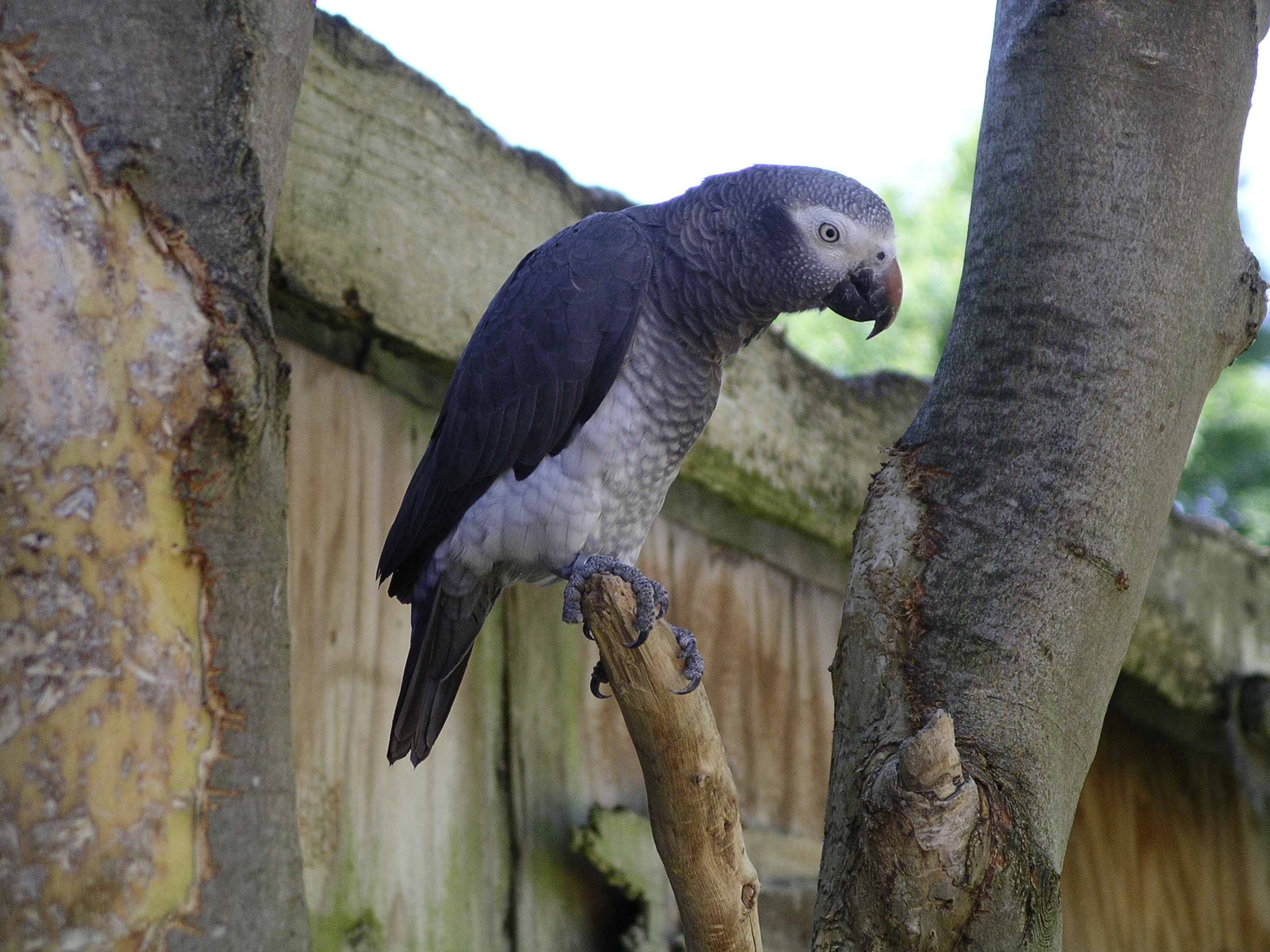
Timneh parrot (wings clipped)

Rarer than previously believed, the grey was uplisted from a species of least concern to near threatened in the 2007 IUCN Red List. A recent analysis suggests up to 21% of the global population may be taken from the wild annually, primarily for the pet trade. In 2012, the species was further uplisted to vulnerable. The species is endemic to primary and secondary rainforests of West and Central Africa. Grey parrots depend on large, old trees for the natural hollows they use for nesting. Studies in Guinea and Guinea-Bissau have found that their preferred species of nesting trees are also species preferred for timber. The relationship between the status of the species and the status of primary forest is positive: where the forests are declining, so too are populations of grey parrots.

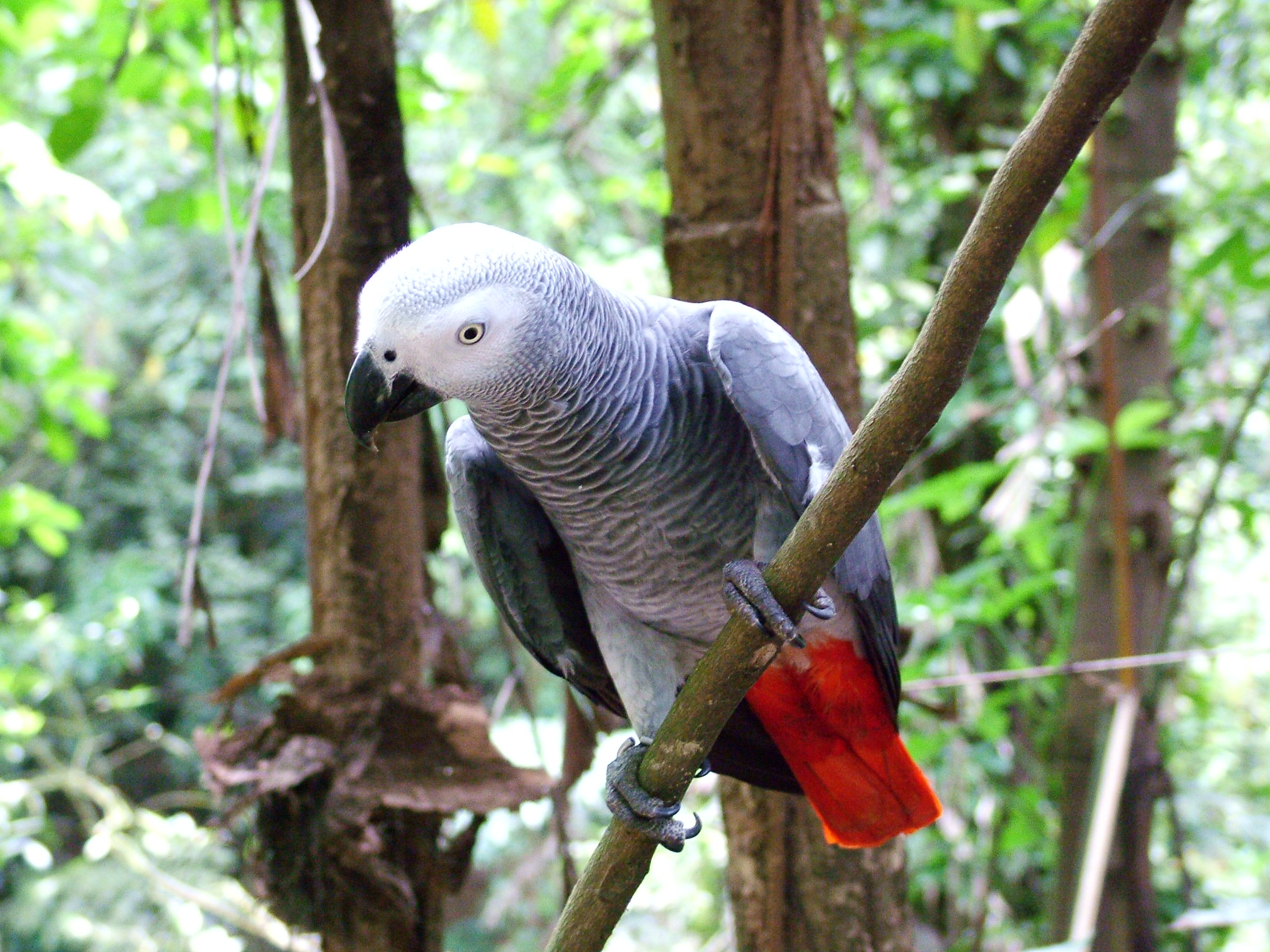
Grey parrot in a bird park

The grey parrot is listed on Appendix II of the Convention on International Trade in Endangered Species of Wild Fauna and Flora (CITES). This requires both that exports be accompanied by a permit issued by a national authority and that a finding be made that the export is not detrimental to the species in the wild. With exports totaling more than 350,000 specimens from 1994 to 2003, the grey parrot is one of the most heavily traded CITES-listed bird species. In response to continuing population declines, exceeded quotas, and unsustainable and illegal trade (including among range states), CITES included the grey parrot in Phase VI of the CITES Review of Significant Trade in 2004. This review has resulted in recommended zero export quotas for several range states and a CITES decision to develop regional management plans for the species.

In the United States, importation of wild-caught grey parrots is prohibited under the US Wild Bird Conservation Act of 1992. In the European Union, an EU Directive of 2007 prevents importation of this and any other wild-caught birds for the pet trade.

== Relationship with humans ==
=== Aviculture ===
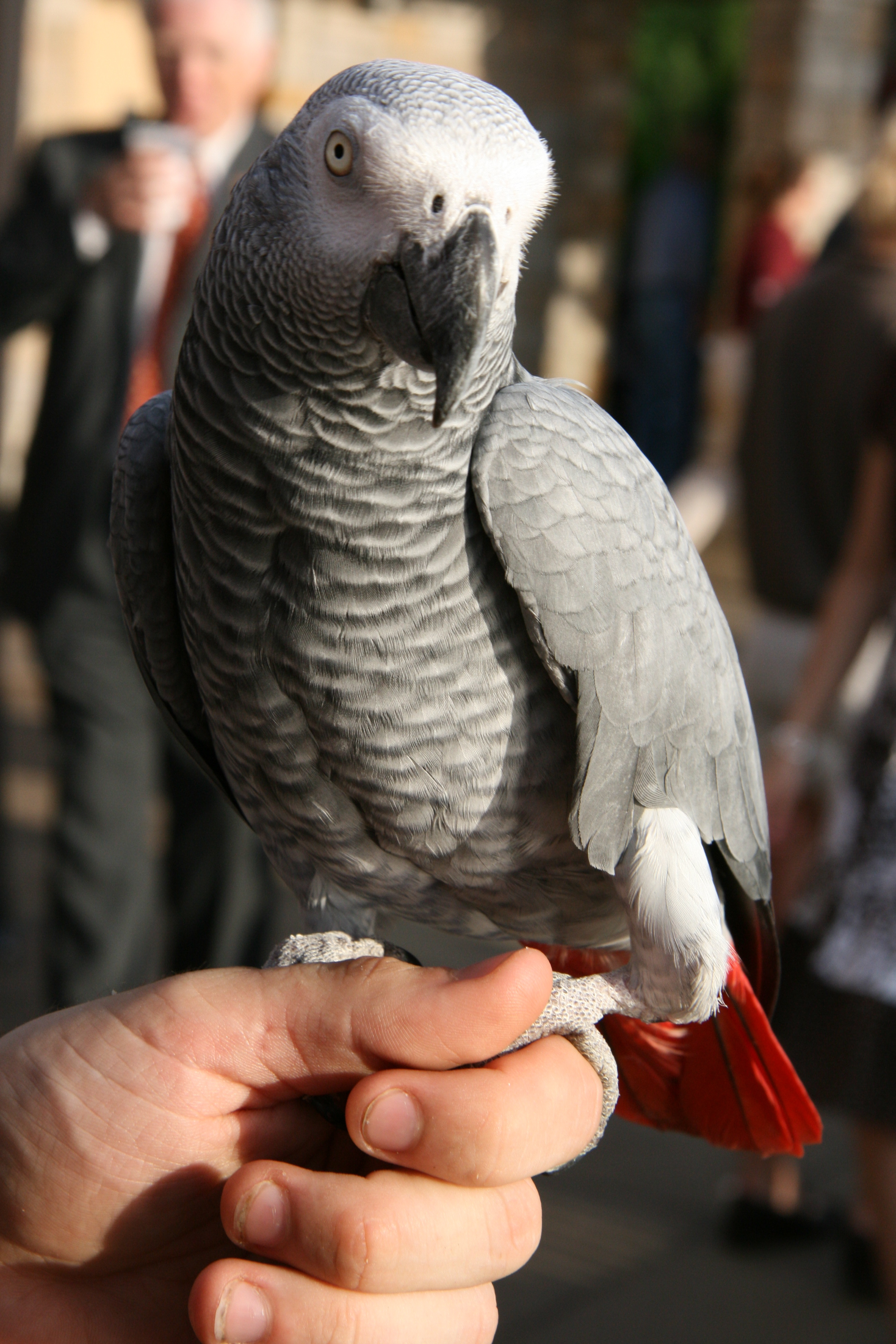
A pet grey parrot

These intelligent mimics can make interesting pets and companion parrots. They have a devoted following among parrot owners. However, the same qualities mean they require a special commitment by their owners to provide frequent one-on-one interaction and supervised time out of their cages. They must be kept stimulated and busy by people and toys or they may become stressed and develop self-destructive behaviour. They require large cages, varied diets that include fresh foods, and plenty of safe and chewable toys. If not provided with these items, these parrots can quickly develop unpleasant behaviour and may eventually develop health problems (such as feather-plucking) that are difficult to remedy.

All pet parrots will likely generate a fair amount of mess and noise. Like most parrots, they are not domesticated, with the average bird usually being only one or two generations removed from its wild predecessor. Despite this, there is a long history of these parrots being kept at pets by the ancient Greeks, wealthy Roman families, King Henry VIII, Portuguese sailors, and others.

== See also ==
- Alex (parrot)
- N'kisi
- Hatebeak
