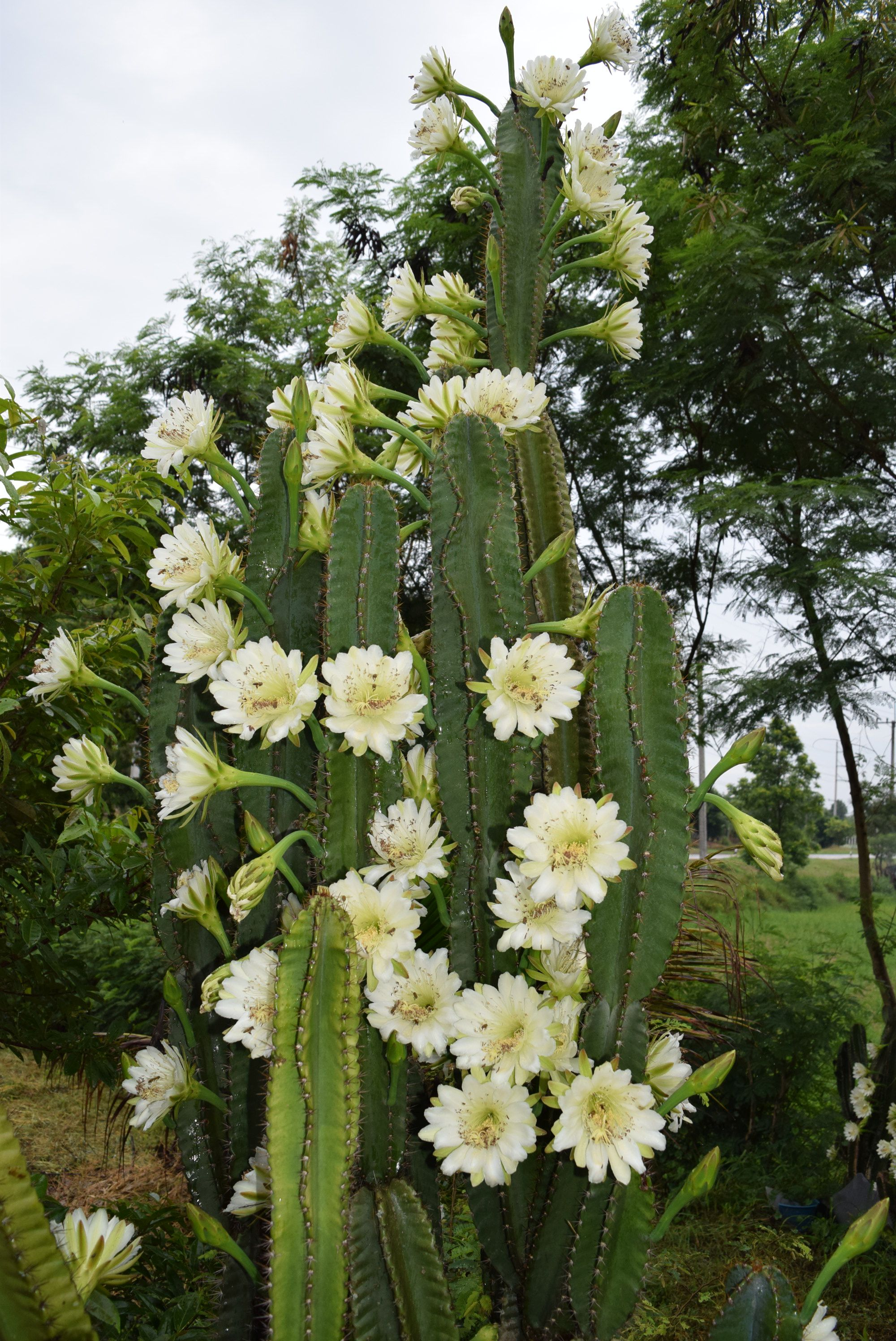

Conservation status
- Least Concern (IUCN 2.3)

Scientific classification
- Kingdom: Plantae
- Clade: Tracheophytes
- Clade: Angiosperms
- Clade: Eudicots
- Order: Caryophyllales
- Family: Cactaceae
- Subfamily: Cactoideae
- Genus: Cereus
- Species: C. jamacaru

Binomial name
- Cereus jamacaru DC.

Synonyms
- Cactus jamacaru (DC.) Kostel. 1835; Piptanthocereus jamacaru (DC.) Riccob. 1909

= Cereus jamacaru =

Species of cactus

Cereus jamacaru, known as mandacaru or cardeiro, is a cactus native to central and eastern Brazil. and naturalized in South Africa. It often grows up to 5 m (16 ft) high.

== Description ==
The plants are succulent trees with woody stem that reach about 9 m (up to 15 m) in height with segmented stems and form large crowns. The trunks reach a diameter of 45 cm with 4 to 6 slightly wavy notches and more in old age. The segmented twigs have four to six ribs 8 to 20 cm long and 5 to 7 radials 1.5 cm long, sometimes up to ten ribs due to ribs that have been pushed in with age. The ribs, which are initially about 3.5 cm high, become higher with advancing age.

Yellow to brown areoles stand on them at a distance of 2 to 4 cm. These carry about 15 to 20 yellowish to brownish spines, which are divided into 7 to 9 radial spines and 6 to 13 central spines. It is not uncommon for the total number of thorns to be reached over the course of many years. The thorns that form later are particularly tough and up to 10 cm long, rarely up to 20 cm, long.

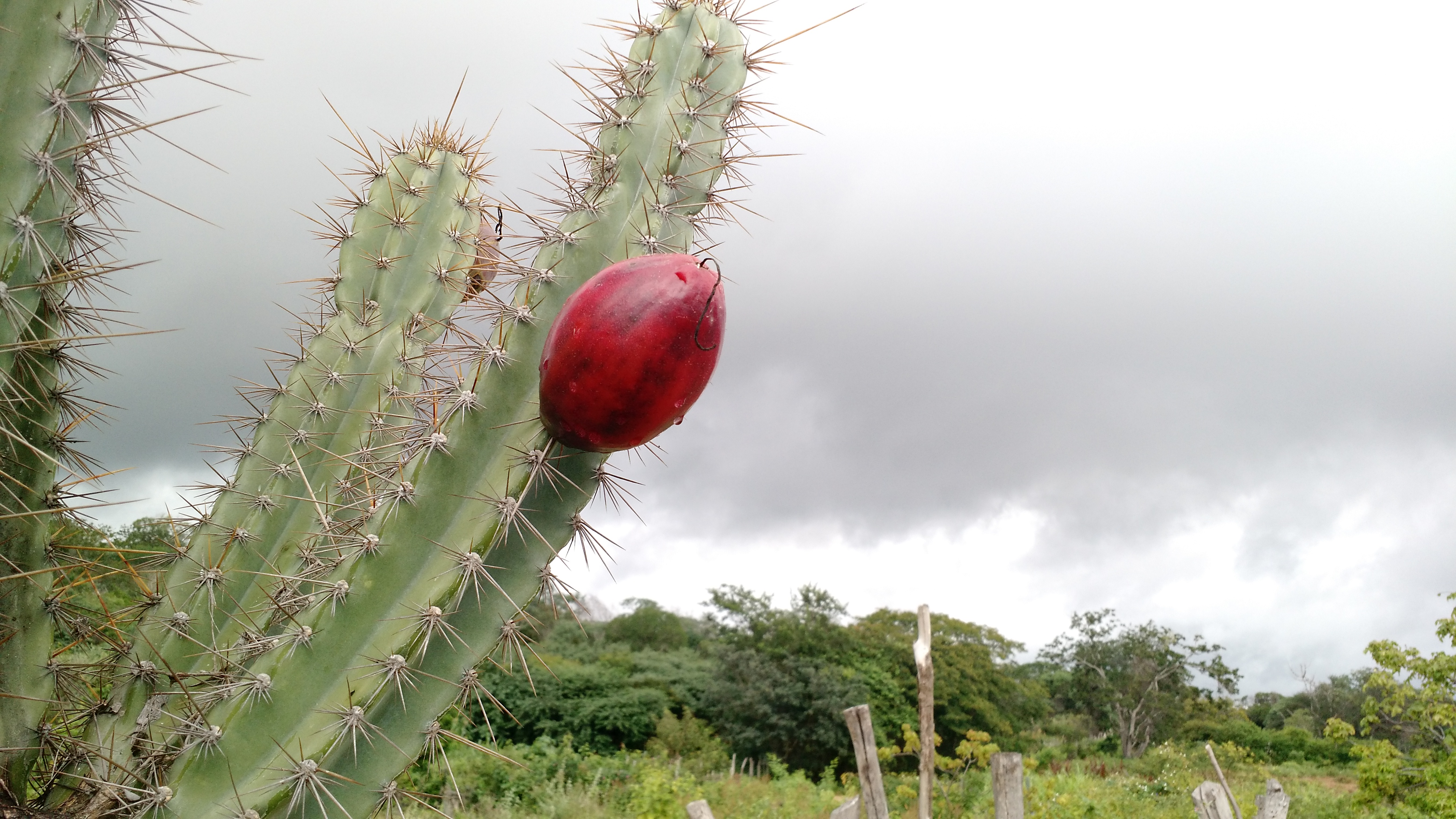
The fruit of Cereus jamacaru

The flowers are white open at night, and are about 30 cm (10 in) long, with green and white outside the petals with a brown outer edge. The outer bracts are brownish to light green, the inner ones are white. The flower buds usually appear in the middle of spring and each flower lasts only for a night. They open at dusk and wither by the morning.

After fertilization, the fruits are egg- to pear-shaped, about 6 cm in diameter and 12 cm long. These turn carmine to coral red when ripe and tear open lengthwise. Its fruit has a very strong violet color. The pulp is white with tiny black seeds, about 3 mm in size.

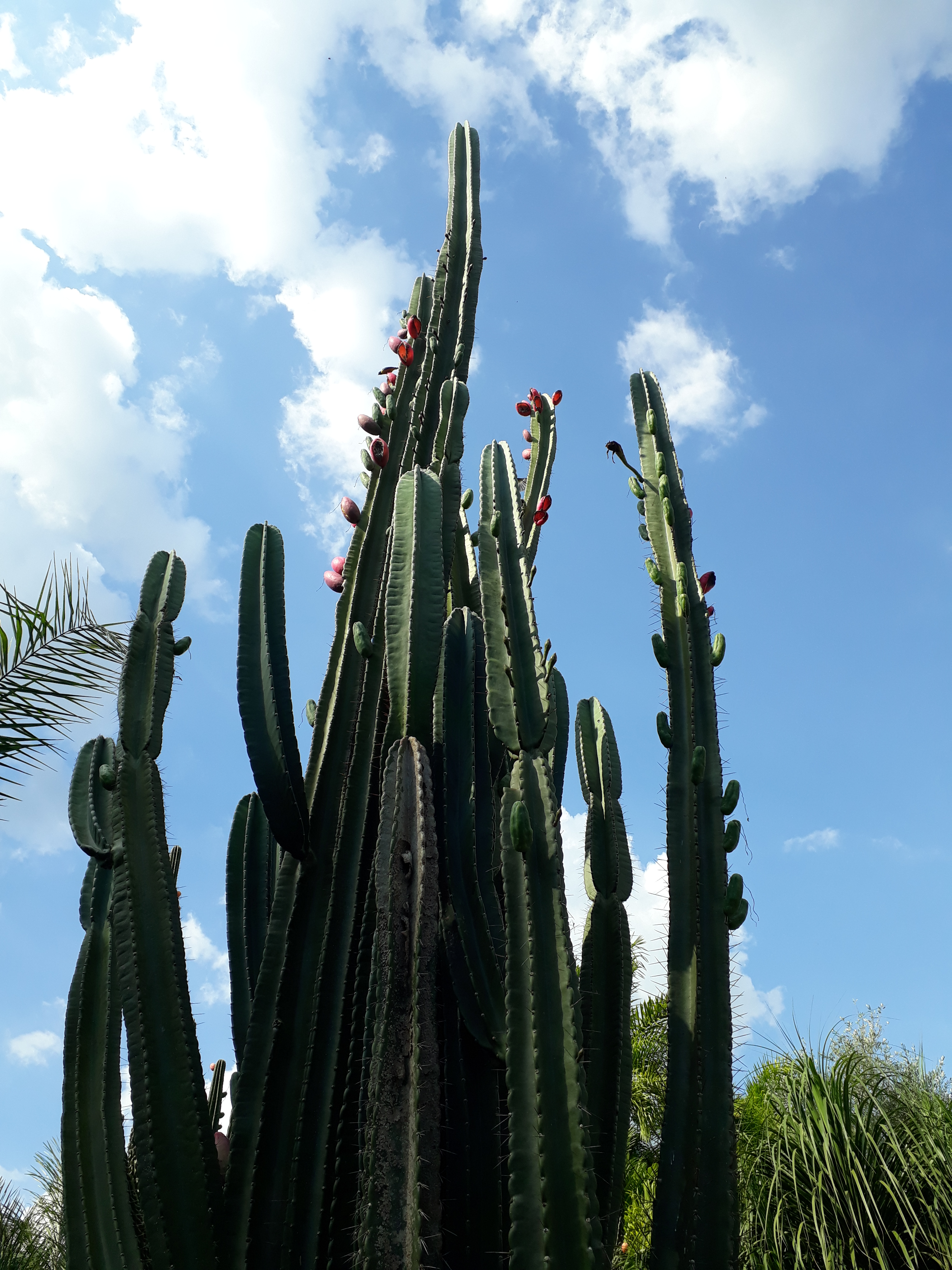
Plant

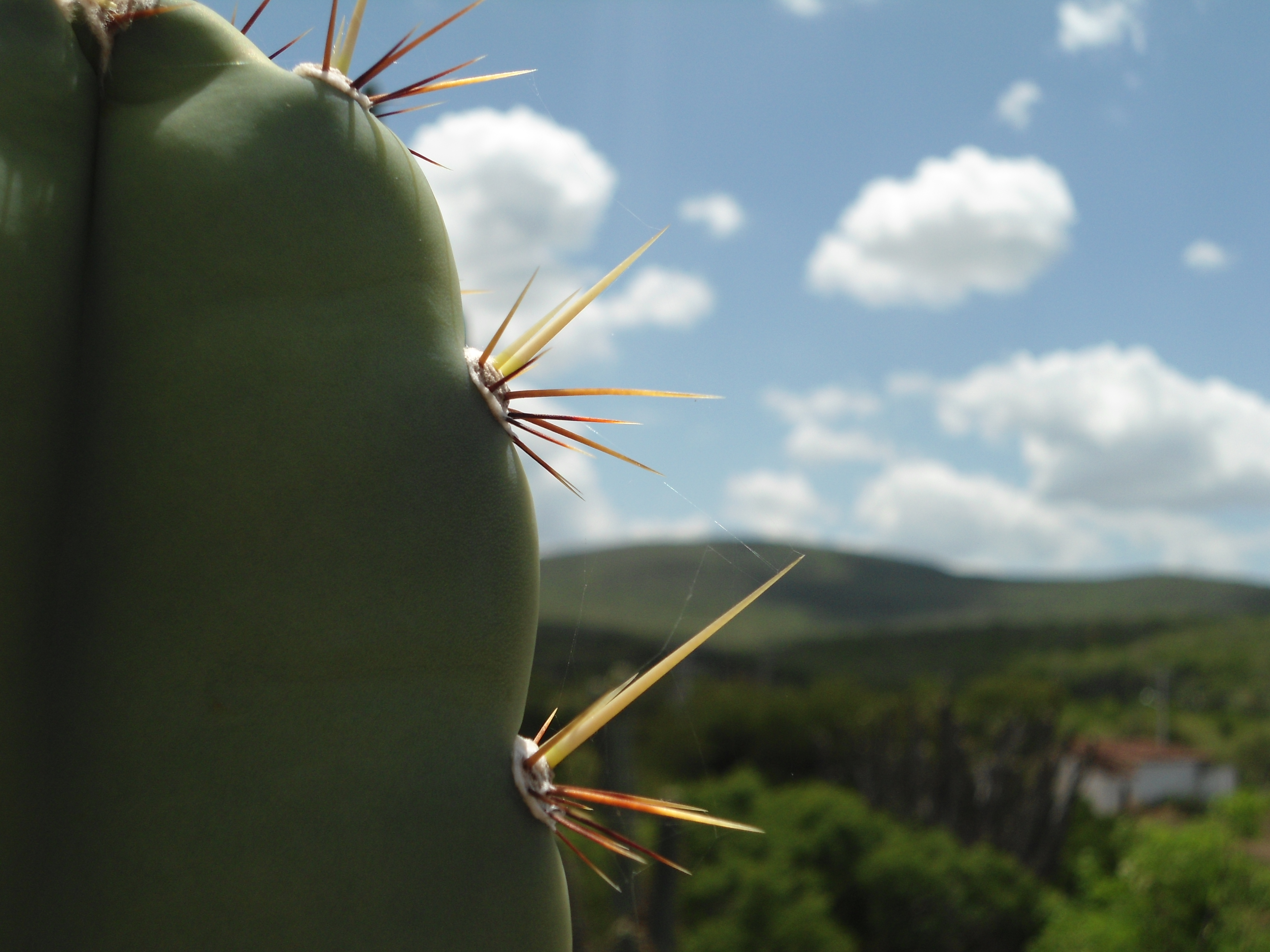
Spines

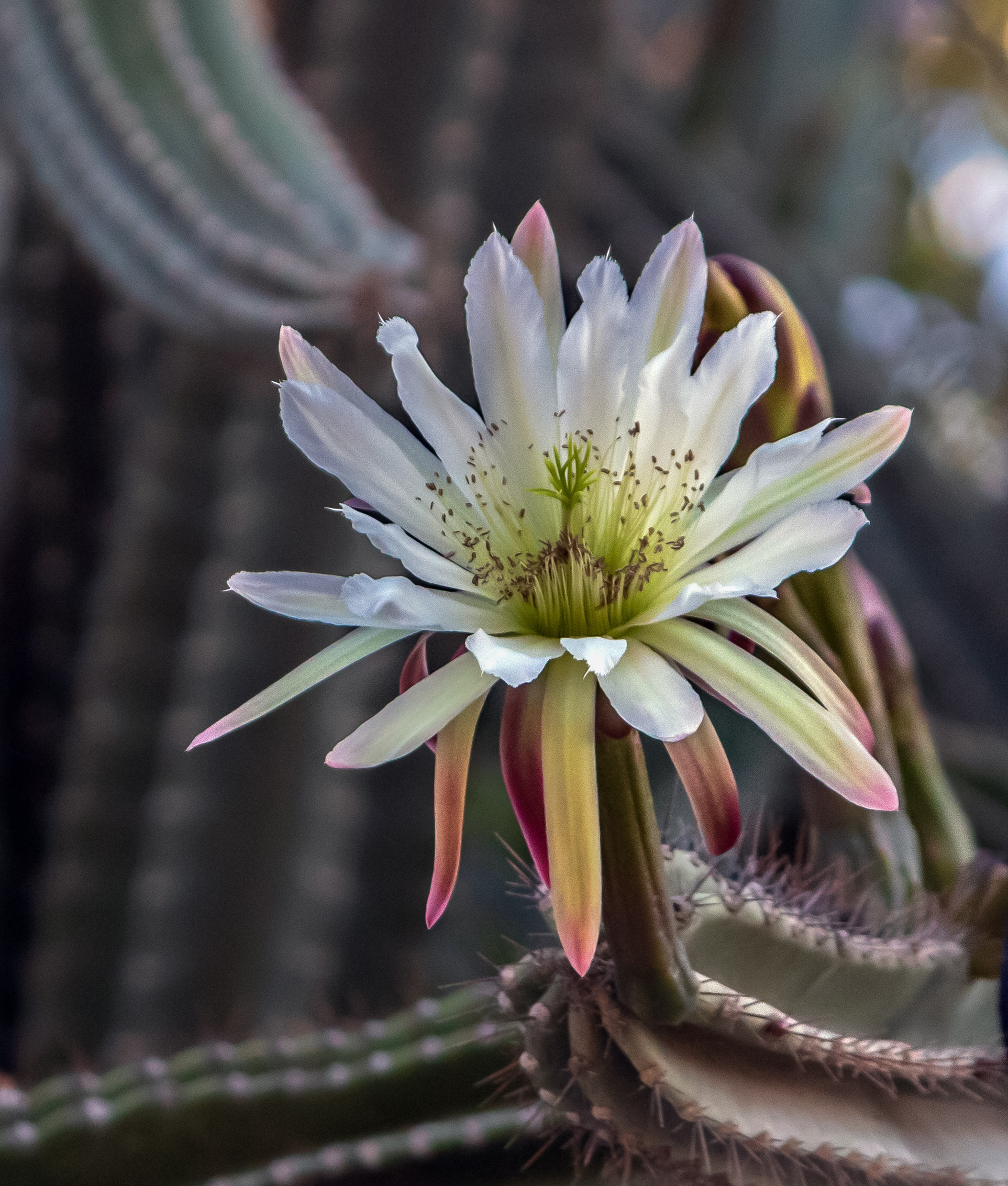
Cereus jamacaru flower - Tunisia

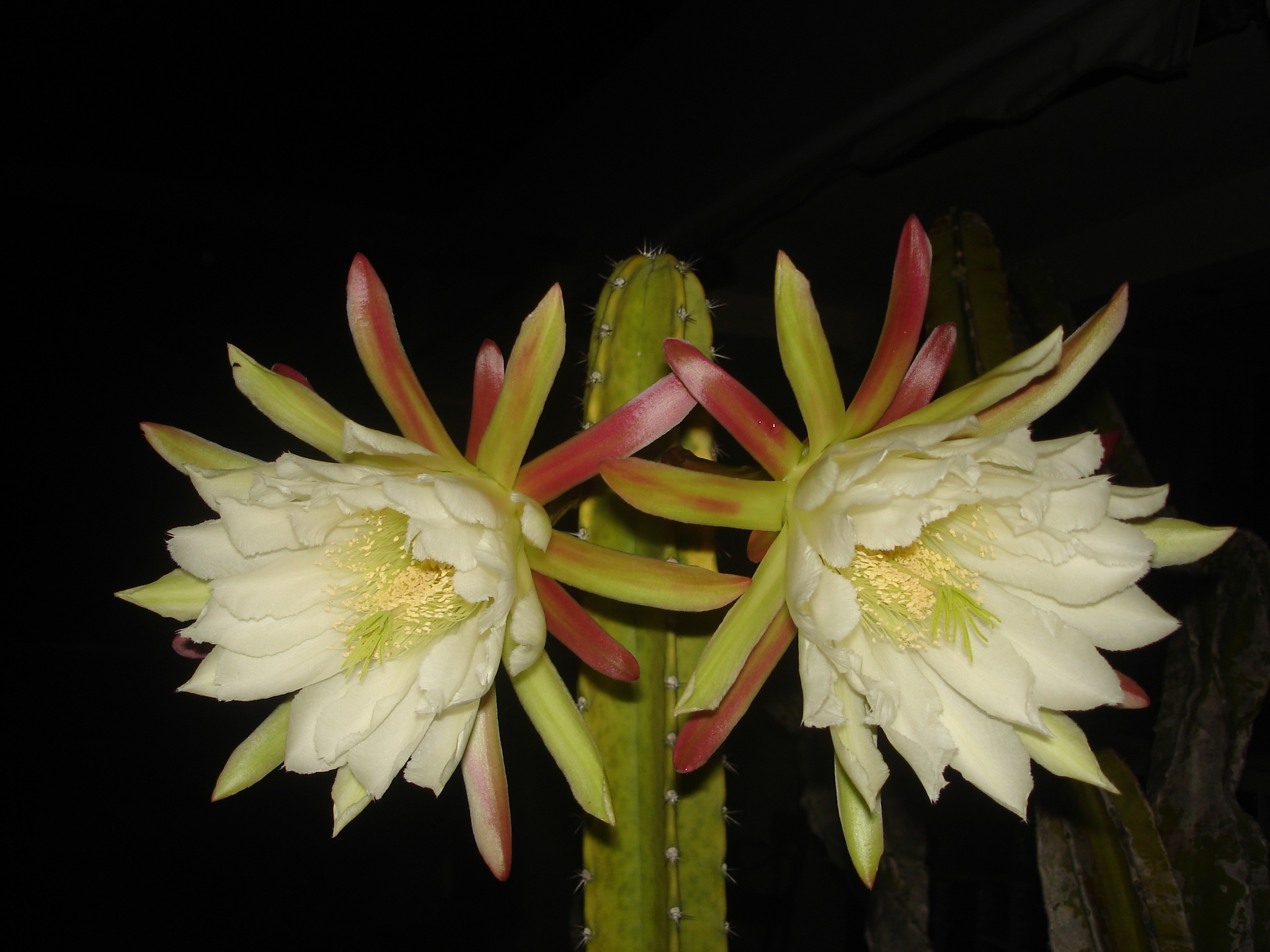
Flowers

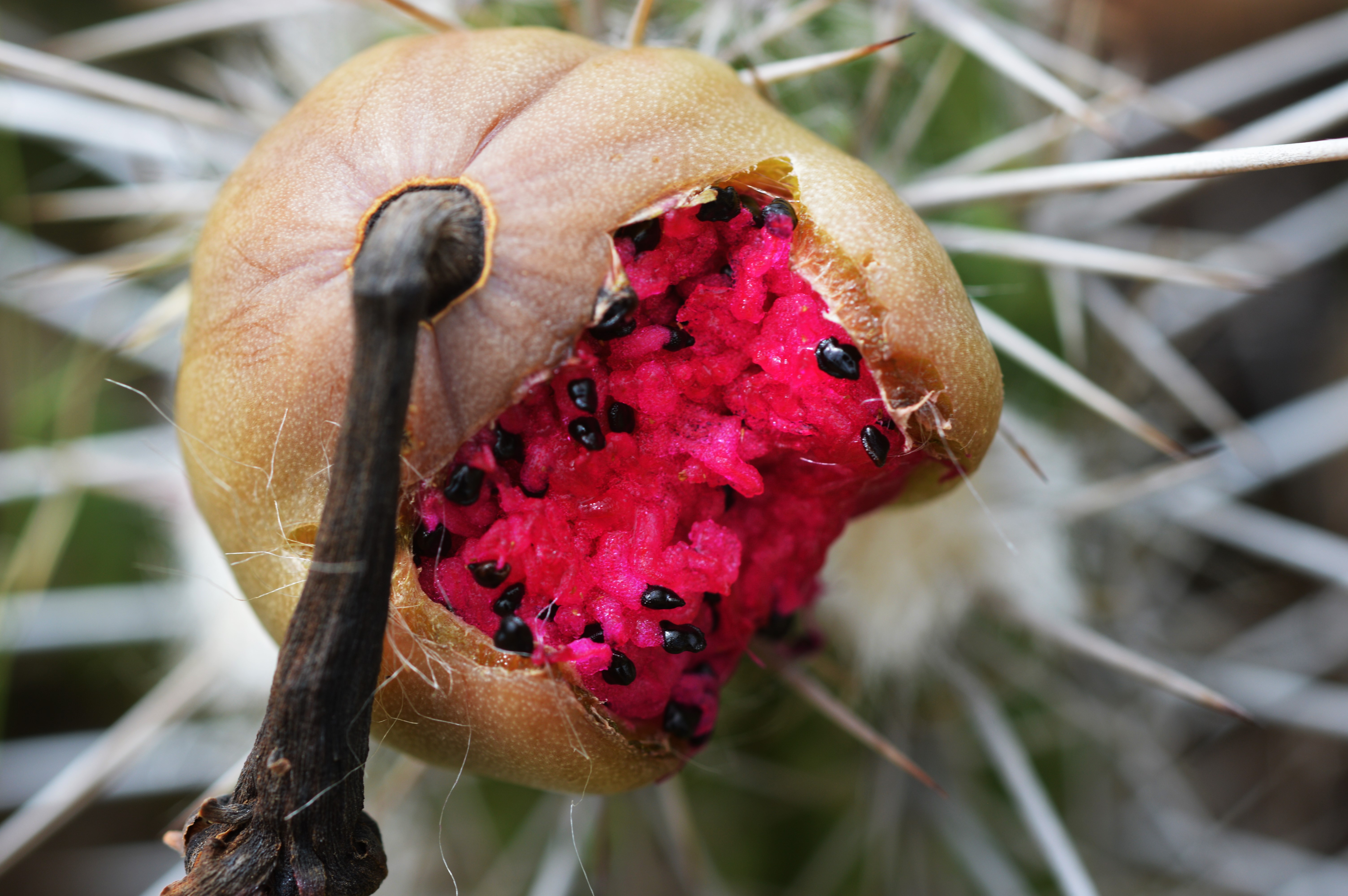
Fruit with pink flesh

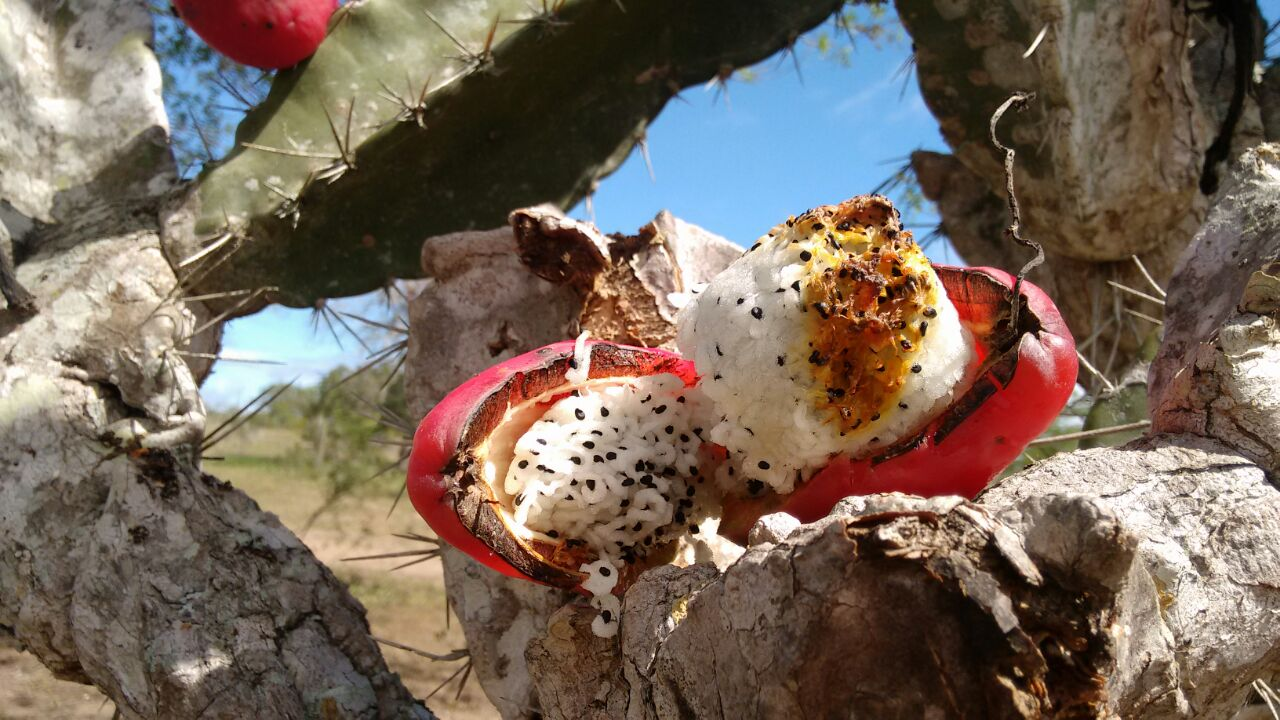
Fruit with white flesh

== Taxonomy ==
Cereus jamacaru was first described by Augustin Pyrame de Candolle and published in Prodromus Systematis Naturalis Regni Vegetabilis 3: 467. 1828. Nomenclatural synonyms are Cactus jamacaru (DC.) Kostel. (1835) and Piptanthocereus jamacaru (DC.) Riccob. (1909)

In the IUCN Red List of Threatened Species the species is listed as "Least Concern (LC)".

=== Subspecies ===
There are two recognized subspecies:

Image	Name	Distribution
	Cereus jamacaru subsp. jamacaru	Brazil ( Alagoas, Bahia, Ceará, Goiás, Maranhão, Minas Gerais, Paraíba, Pernambuco, Piauí and Rio Grande do Norte )
	Cereus jamacaru subsp. calcirupicola (F.Ritter) N.P.Taylor & Zappi	Minas Gerais in Limestone outcrops

== Distribution ==
It is endemic to the Brazilian states of Alagoas, Bahia, Ceará, Goiás, Maranhão, Minas Gerais, Paraíba, Pernambuco, Piauí and Rio Grande do Norte. It is a very common species in the semi-arid caatinga habitats. Many birds feed on the fruit, like the white-naped jay, "gralha-cancã" and the Caatinga parakeet "periquito-da-caatinga."

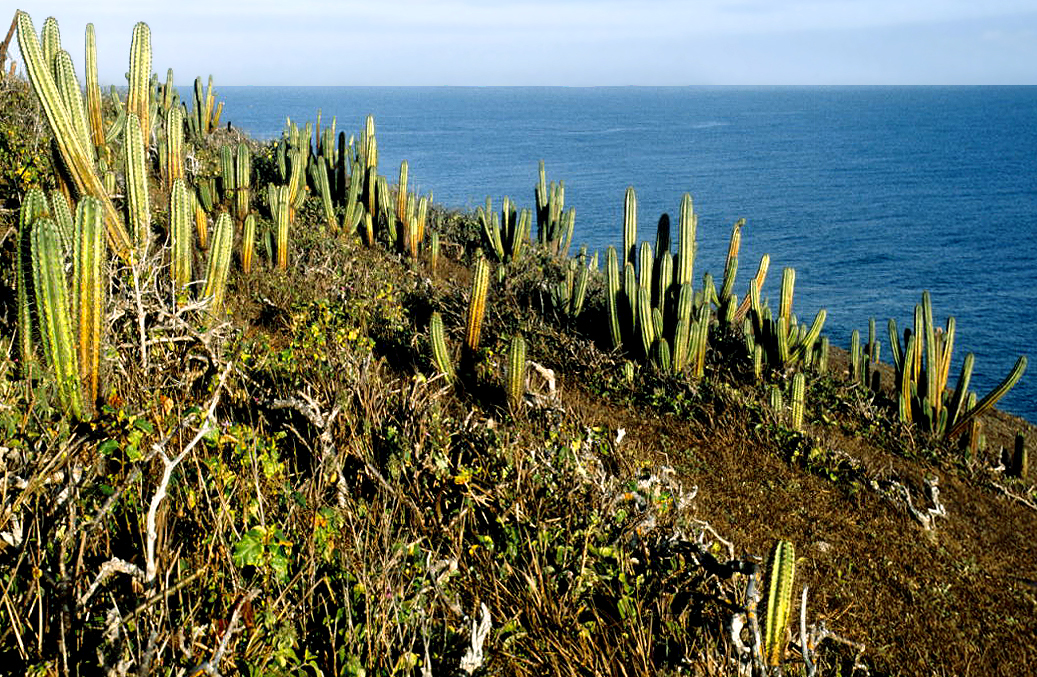
Plants growing in Jijoca de Jericoacoara, Ceará, Brazil

== Uses ==
The flag of Petrolina

A thorn-less kind is used for animal feed. The most common kind is very thorny but is also used for animal feed, after burning or cutting off the thorns. Mandacaru is highly drought-resistant.

The mandacaru is featured on the flag of the city of Petrolina in the state of Pernambuco.
