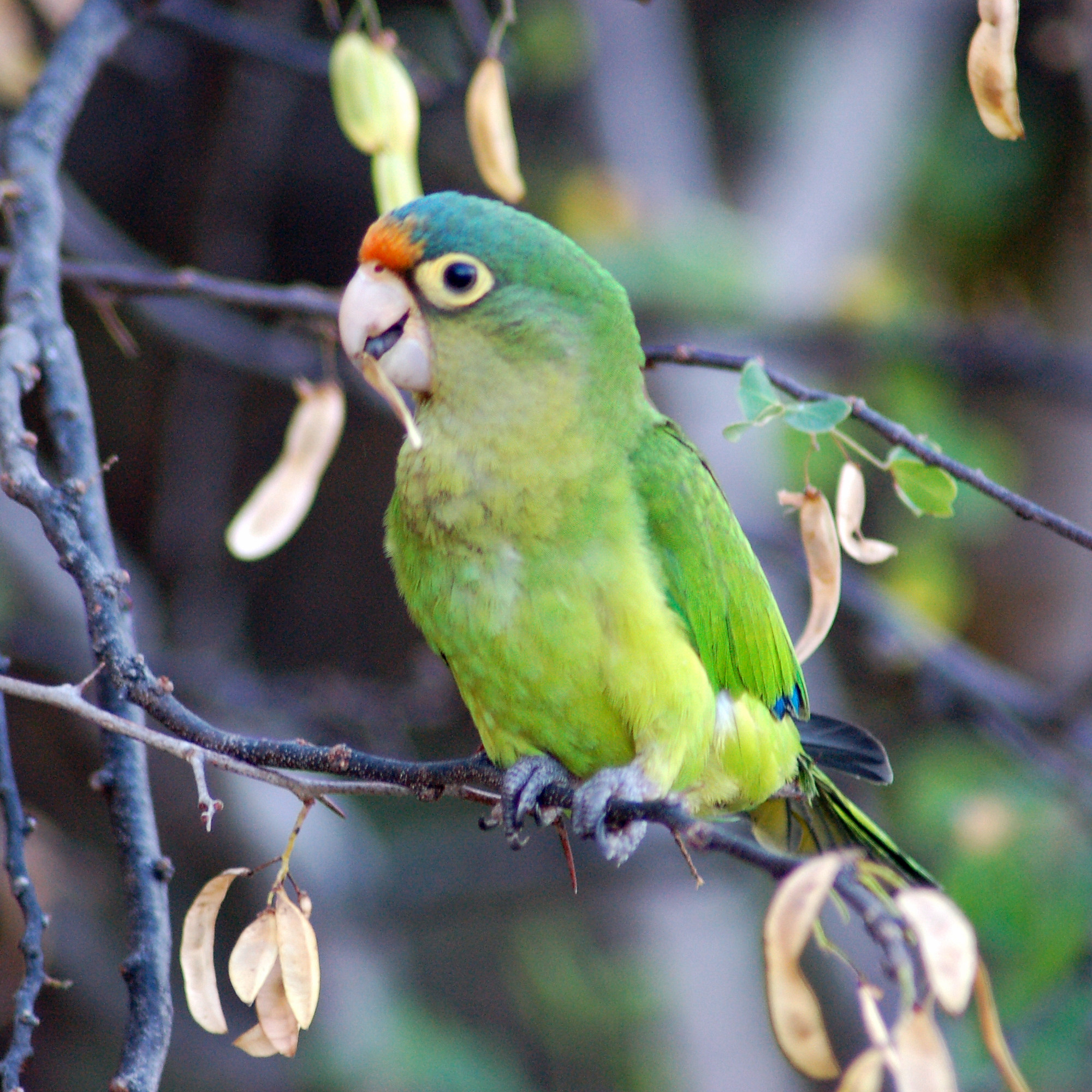
- In a tree feeding on seeds, Gulf of Papagayo, Costa Rica

Conservation status
- Vulnerable (IUCN 3.1)
- CITES Appendix II

Scientific classification
- Kingdom: Animalia
- Phylum: Chordata
- Class: Aves
- Order: Psittaciformes
- Family: Psittacidae
- Genus: Eupsittula
- Species: E. canicularis

Binomial name
- Eupsittula canicularis (Linnaeus, 1758)

Synonyms
- Aratinga canicularis (Linnaeus, 1758); Psittacus canicularis Linnaeus, 1758; Psittacus petzii Leiblein, 1832

= Eupsittula canicularis =

Orange-fronted parakeet

Species of Central American bird

Eupsittula canicularis, also known as the orange-fronted parakeet, orange-fronted conure, half-moon conure or Petz's conure is a vulnerable species of birds in subfamily Arinae of the family Psittacidae, the African and New World parrots. It is found from western Mexico to Costa Rica.

== Taxonomy and systematics ==
The orange-fronted parakeet was formally described in 1758 by Swedish naturalist Carl Linnaeus in the 10th edition of his Systema Naturae. He placed it with all the other parrots in the genus Psittacus and coined the binomial name Psittacus canicularis. The type locality is northwestern Costa Rica. Linnaeus based his description on the "red and blue-headed parakeet" that had been described and illustrated in 1751 by the English naturalist George Edwards in the fourth part of his A Natural History of Common Birds. The orange-fronted parakeet is now one of five species placed in the genus Eupsittula that was introduced in 1853 by the French naturalist Charles Lucien Bonaparte. The genus name combines the Ancient Greek eu meaning "good" with the Modern Latin psittula meaning "little parrot". The specific epithet canicularis is Latin meaning "of the bright star Sirius".

The orange-fronted parakeet has three recognized subspecies:

- E. c. clarae (Moore, R.T., 1937)
- E. c. eburnirostrum (Lesson, R., 1842)
- E. c. canicularis (Linnaeus, 1758)

== Description ==
The orange-fronted parakeet is 23 to 25 cm (9.1 to 9.8 in) long and weighs 68 to 80 g (2.4 to 2.8 oz). The sexes are alike. Adults of the nominate subspecies E. c. canicularis have an orange-peach forehead (the "front") and lores, a dull blue midcrown, and a dull green hindcrown, nape, and back. A ring of bare yellow skin surrounds the eyes. Their throat and breast are pale olive brown and the rest of their underparts are yellowish green. Their wings are green with bluish flight feathers. The top surface of their tail is green and the bottom surface is yellowish. Immatures are like adults, but with much less orange on the forehead. Subspecies E. c. clarae has a very narrow orange forehead band, a greener throat and breast than the nominate, and a black spot on the mandible. E. c. eburnirostrum also has a narrow forehead band and is greener below than the nominate; it has a brown spot on the mandible.

== Distribution and habitat ==
The subspecies of the orange-fronted parakeet are found thus:

- E. c. clarae, western Mexico from Sinaloa and Durango south to Michoacán
- E. c. eburnirostrum, southwestern Mexico from Michoacán to Oaxaca
- E. c. canicularis, Pacific coast from Chiapas in southern Mexico through Guatemala, Honduras, El Salvador, and Nicaragua into northwestern Costa Rica; introduced to Puerto Rico

The orange-fronted parakeet inhabits a variety of landscapes, most of them semiopen to open. These include the edges of forest, deciduous woodlands, Pacific swamp forest, savanna, and thorn scrub. It also occurs in pastures with scattered trees and plantations of palms and fruiting trees such as mangoes and bananas. It is primarily a bird of lowlands and foothills, but ranges as high as 1,500 m (4,900 ft) above sea level.

== Behavior ==
=== Movement ===
The orange-fronted parakeet forms nomadic flocks outside the breeding season and at that time reaches the higher elevations of its range; the flocks can contain several hundred individuals.

=== Feeding ===
The orange-fronted parakeet feeds on fruits (e.g. Ficus), flowers (e.g. Gliricidia), and seeds (e.g. Ceiba). The large wandering flocks "can cause serious damage to young maize and ripening bananas."

=== Breeding ===
The orange-fronted parakeet nests between January and May in Mexico and El Salvador and December to March in Costa Rica. It usually excavates a cavity in a nest of the arboreal termite Nasutitermes nigriceps but sometimes uses a natural fissure or a cavity dug by a woodpecker. The clutch size is three to five eggs; the female alone incubates them. The incubation period is about 30 days and fledging occurs about six weeks after hatch.

Both the male and female orange-fronted parakeets excavate a cavity in the termite mound using their beaks (the male doing the majority of the early digging) over the course of about a week. Following this, the birds leave the new cavity alone for 7–10 days, to allow time for the termites to seal off and abandon the damaged area. They then return and proceed to nest inside. Parakeet activity often causes the eventual disintegration of the termite nest due to irreparable structural damage, which provides an opportunity to predatory ants to enter the colony.

=== Vocalization ===
The orange-fronted parakeet's calls include "a scratchy, high-pitched keea'ah! and a lower keh'keh'keh'keh'keh". It also has "a whining ehhhhh"call.

== In aviculture ==
The orange-fronted parakeet (more commonly known as the half-moon conure in aviculture) is sometimes kept as a companion parrot. An excitable, energetic bird that enjoys climbing and playing, it tends to be quieter than some other conure species and is good-natured when properly socialized. It is not noted as a talking bird, but may mimic a few words or sounds. To remain healthy, it requires regular mental stimulation and time outside of its cage in which to fly.

== Status ==
The IUCN originally assessed the orange-fronted parakeet in 2004 as being of least concern, but since 2020, has listed it as vulnerable. It has a somewhat limited range and an estimated population of one-half to five million mature individuals, which is believed to be decreasing. "The species is threatened by illegal trapping for the parrot trade. Population declines have been rapid in the past, but the rates of illegal capture appear to be slowing down in recent years, at least in parts of its range." It does appear to tolerate some habitat destruction.

== Gallery ==
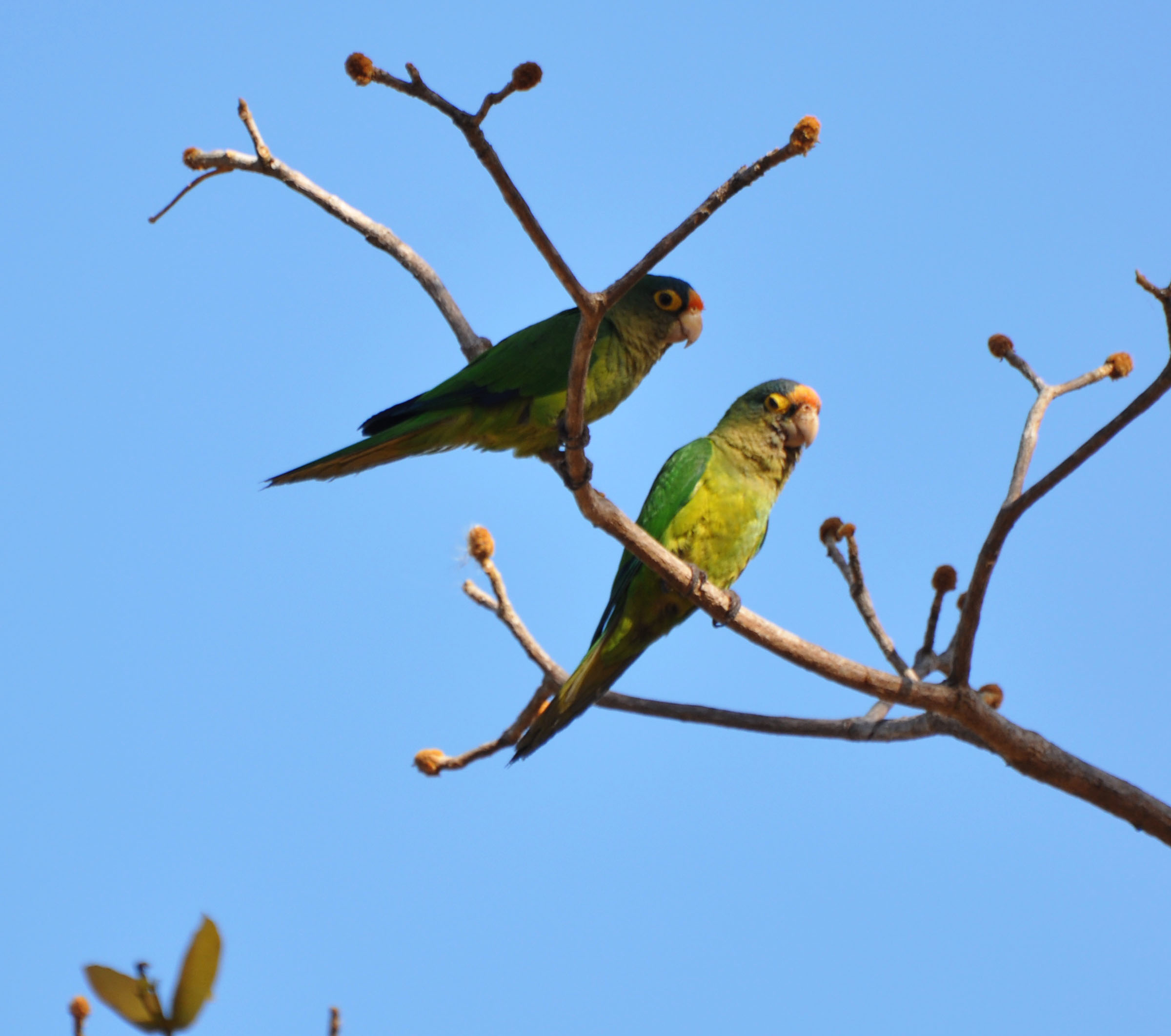
Two birds in Costa Rica

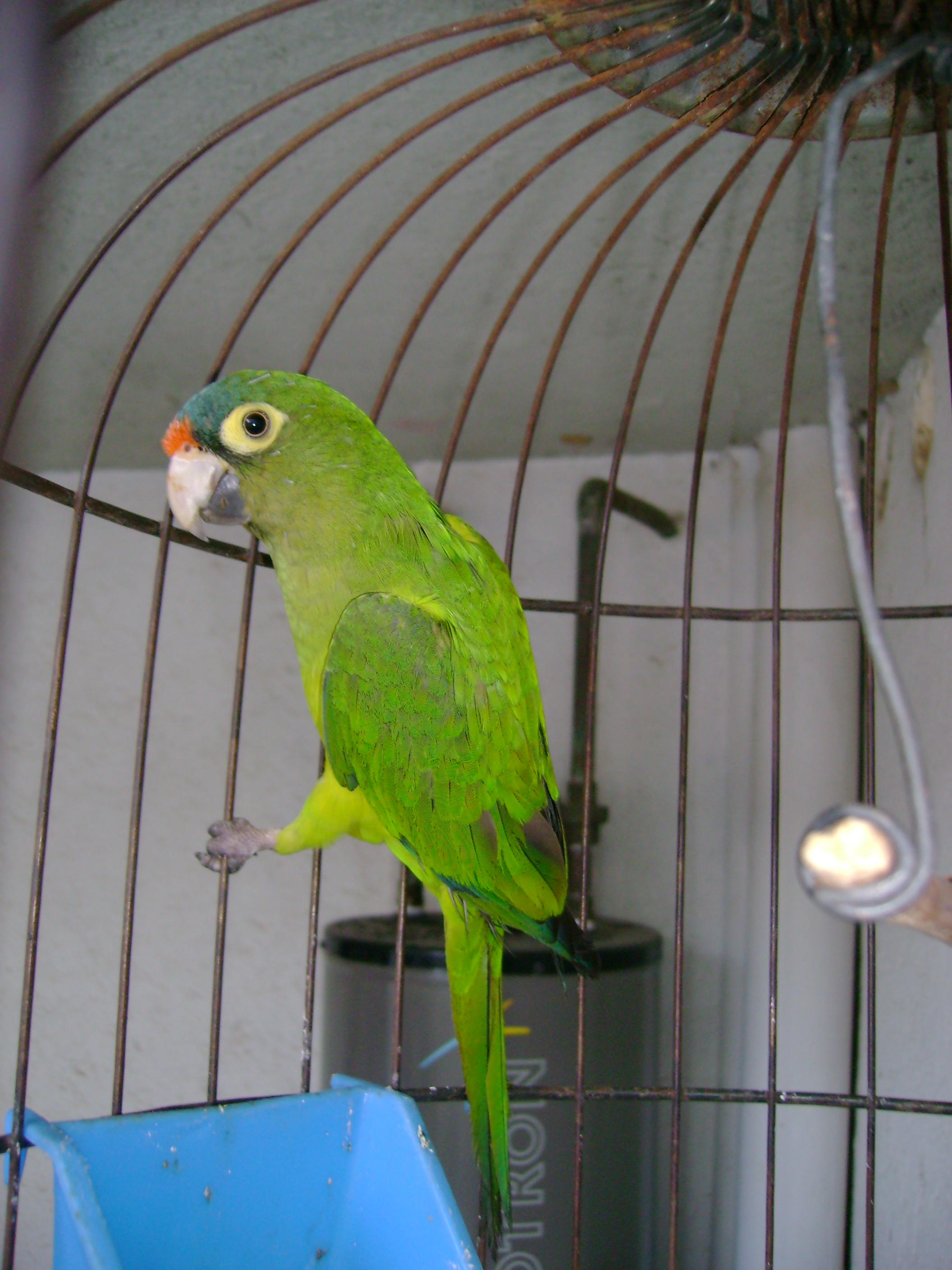
Pet orange-fronted parakeet

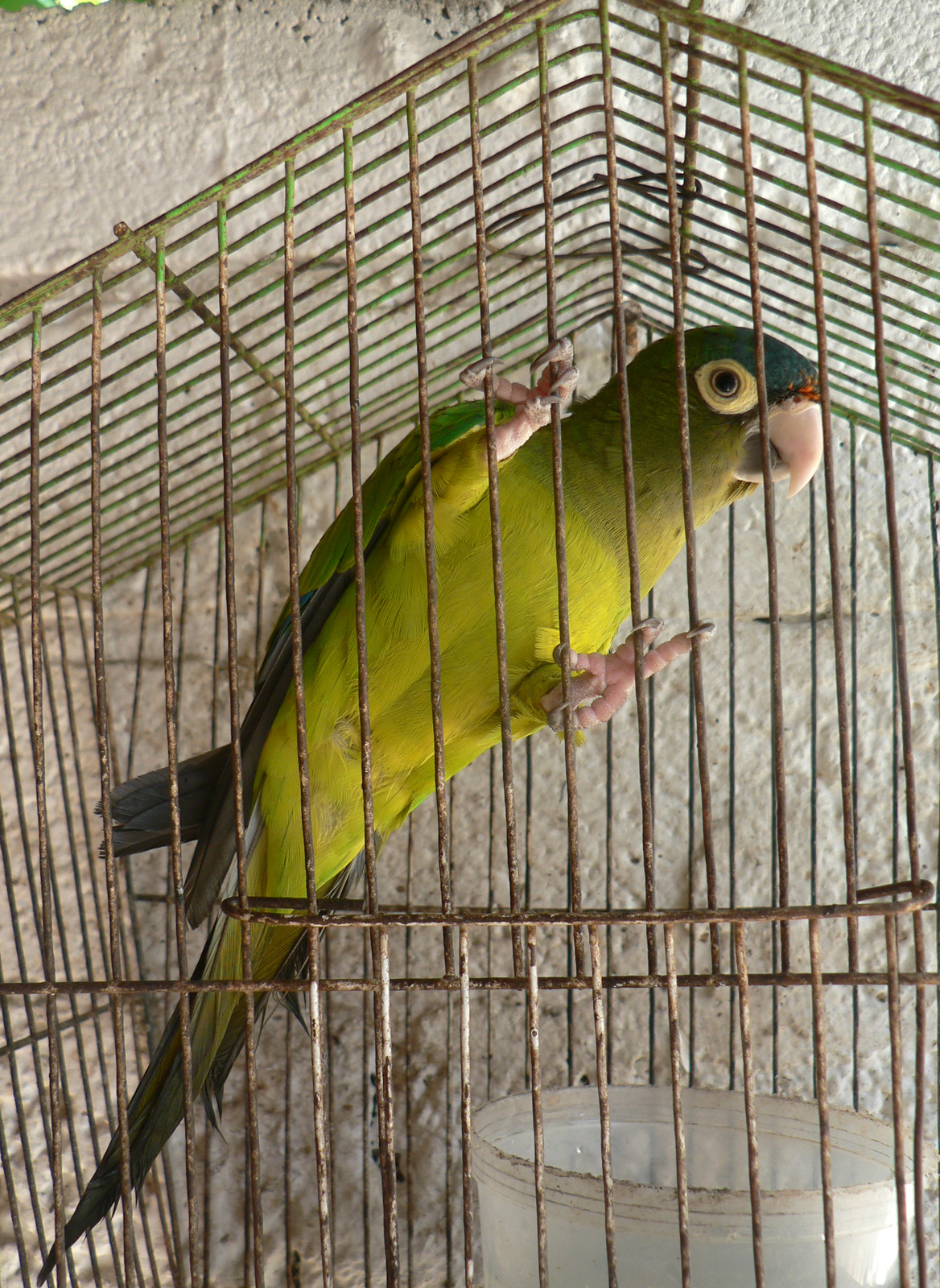
Pet orange-fronted parakeet in a cage in Mexico

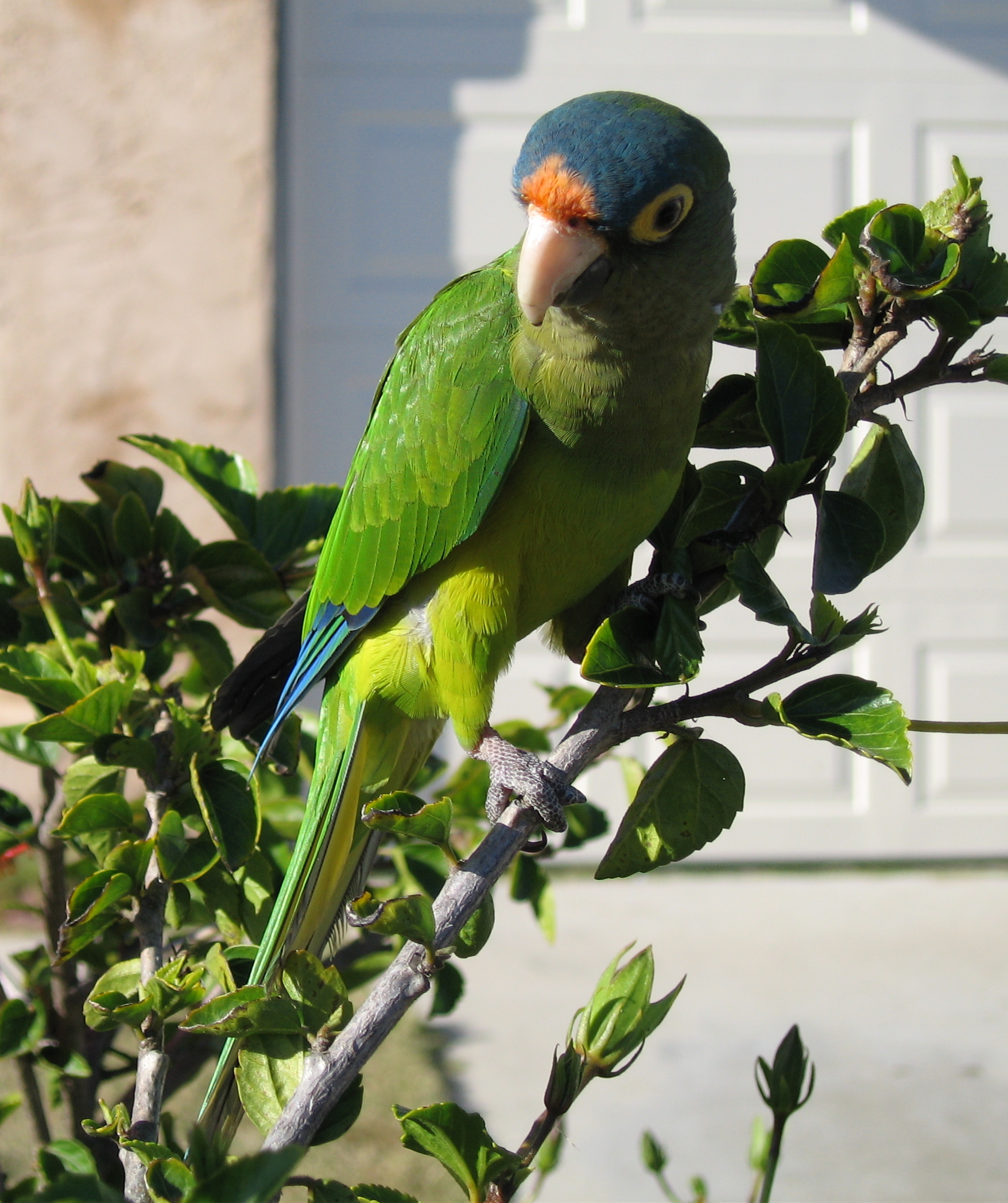
Pet orange-fronted parakeet in garden

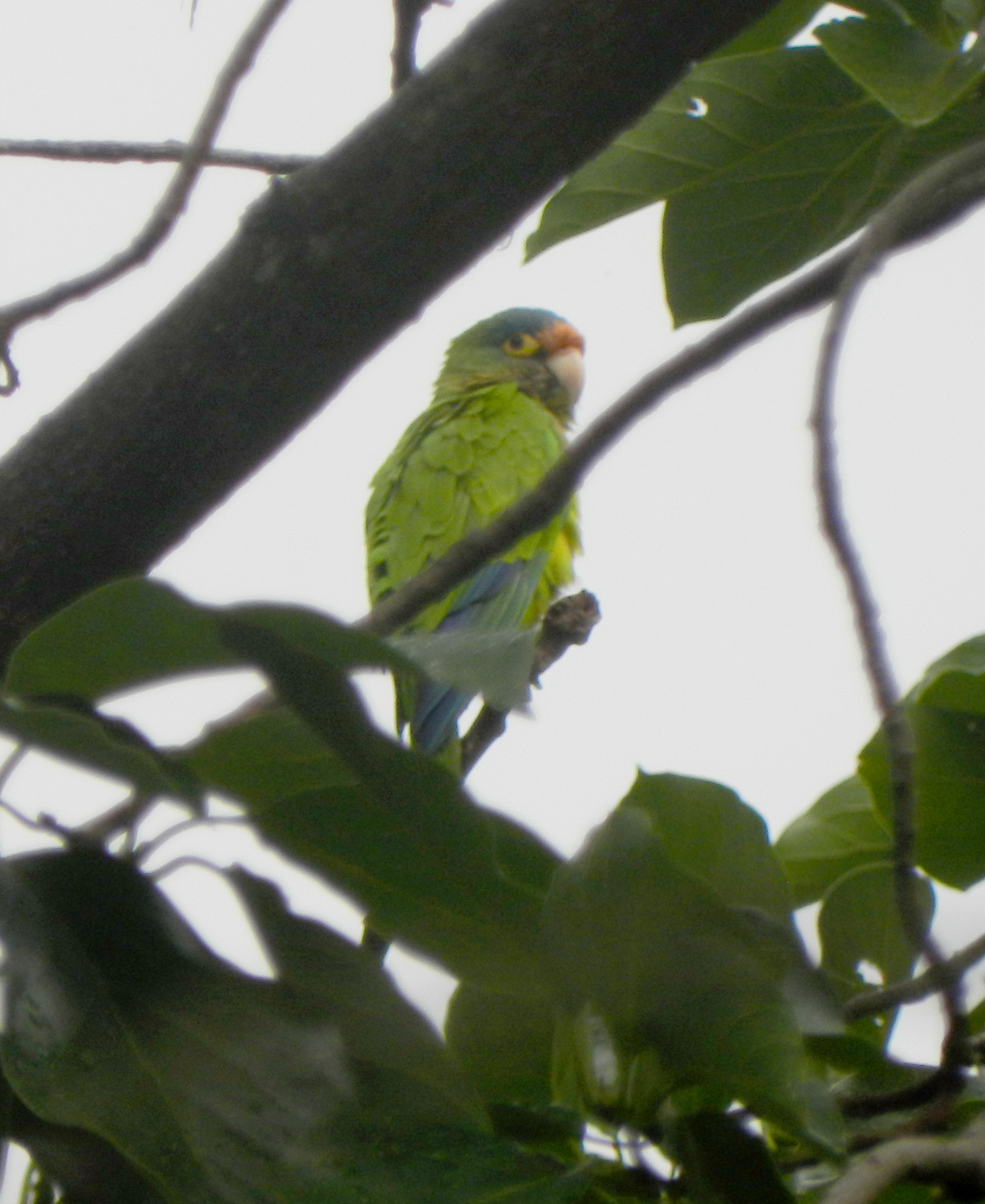
Chocoyo in El Crucero, Nicaragua

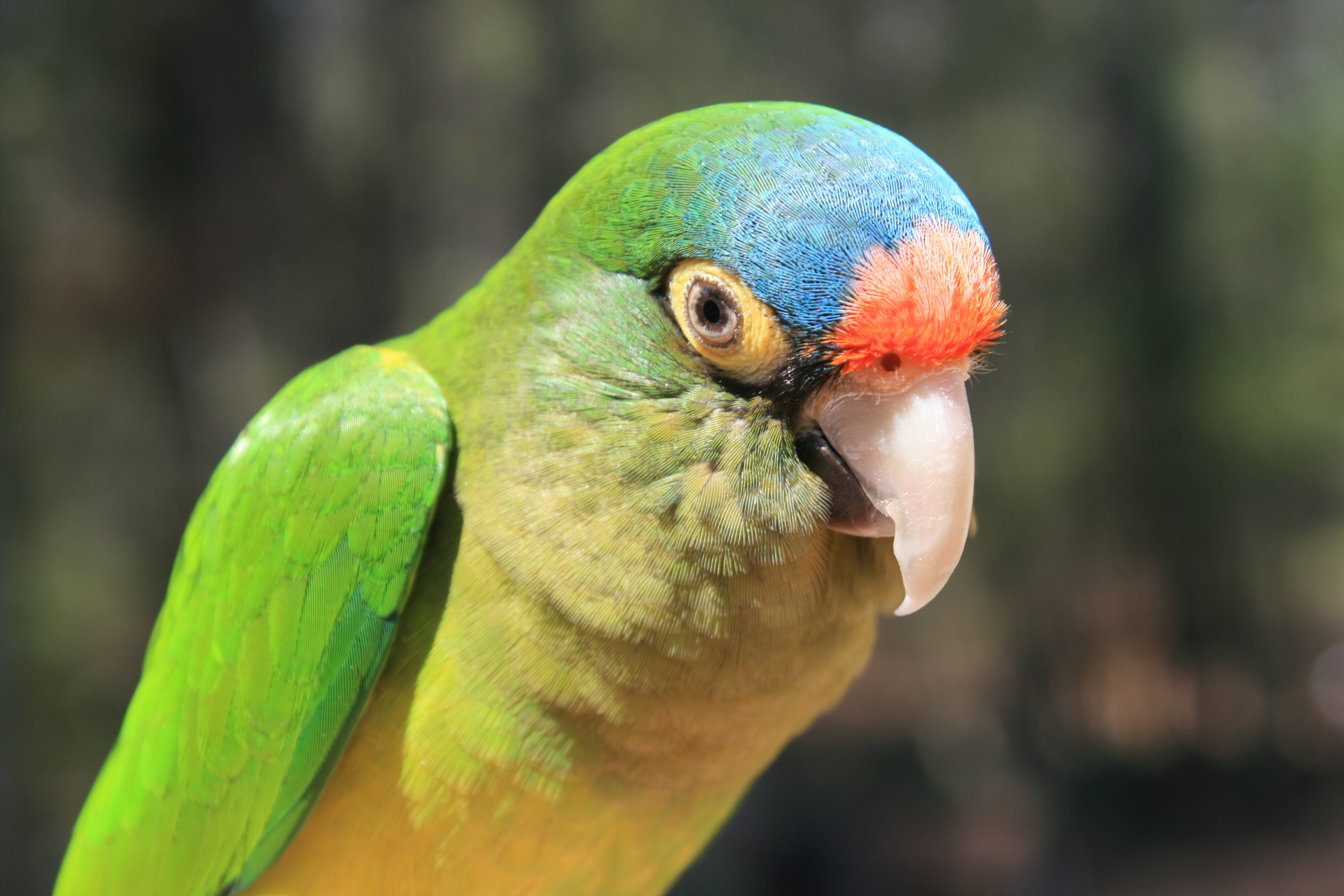
Closeup of a pet half-moon conure in captivity
