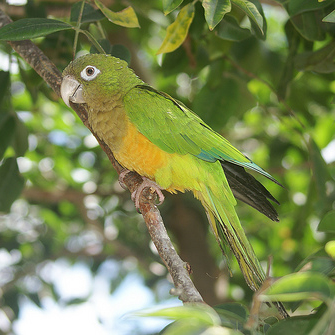

Conservation status
- Least Concern (IUCN 3.1)
- CITES Appendix II

Scientific classification
- Kingdom: Animalia
- Phylum: Chordata
- Class: Aves
- Order: Psittaciformes
- Family: Psittacidae
- Genus: Eupsittula
- Species: E. cactorum

Binomial name
- Eupsittula cactorum (Kuhl, 1820)

= Caatinga parakeet =

Species of bird

The Caatinga parakeet (Eupsittula cactorum), also called the cactus parakeet and in aviculture the cactus conure, is a species of bird in subfamily Arinae of the family Psittacidae, the African and New World parrots. It is endemic to eastern Brazil.

== Taxonomy and systematics ==
Two subspecies are accepted, the nominate E. c. cactorum (Kuhl, 1820) and E. c. caixana (Spix, 1824). The Cattinga parakeet and the brown-throated parakeet (E. pertinax) form a species pair.

== Description ==
The Caatinga parakeet is about 25 cm (9.8 in) long. The sexes are alike. Adults of the nominate subspecies have a pale brown forecrown, cheeks, throat, sides of the neck, and breast. Bare whitish skin surrounds their eye. Their belly and vent area are yellow-orange. Their nape, ear coverts, upperparts, and tail are green. Their wings are mostly green with bluish flight feathers. Immature birds are similar to adults but have a completely green crown and duller underparts. Subspecies E. c. caixana has the same plumage pattern as the nominate but is overall paler.

== Distribution and habitat ==
The subspecies E. c. caixana is the more northerly of the two. It is found in northeastern Brazil from Maranhão east to the Atlantic Ocean and south as far as northwestern Bahia. The nominate subspecies is found in east-central Brazil south of the São Francisco River in Bahia and Minas Gerais. The species inhabits pristine and second-growth caatinga, a dry landscape characterized by thorny vegetation, shrubs, and succulents. It also occurs in cerrado and moister woodlands.

== Behavior ==
=== Movement ===
It has no known movement pattern, but it probably makes local movements in response to the availability of food.

=== Feeding ===
The diet has not been fully investigated. It is known to feed on fruits of figs (Ficus), cactus, and several other plants. It has been reported feeding on flower buds. It also feeds on crops like rice, maize and sorghum.

=== Breeding ===
The breeding season is not well defined, but it seems to be within the August to March period. It typically excavates its nest in arboreal termitaria. The clutch's range in the wild is not known for certain but nests with up to six eggs have been found. In captivity the typical clutch size is six, the incubation period is at least 16 days, and fledging occurs about six weeks after hatch.

=== Vocalization ===
The flight calls are "high-pitched screeching 'scraart scraart' cries, as well as a softer, shorter and bisyllabic 'tchit tchit' and loud 'cherr-chee'."

== Status ==
The IUCN has assessed the Caatinga parakeet as being of Least Concern. It has a large range and though its population size is not known it is believed to be stable. No immediate threats have been identified. It is the most common parrot in some parts of its range. "However, caatinga is poorly protected (0.1% of original area [is] inside reserves) and being steadily degraded."
