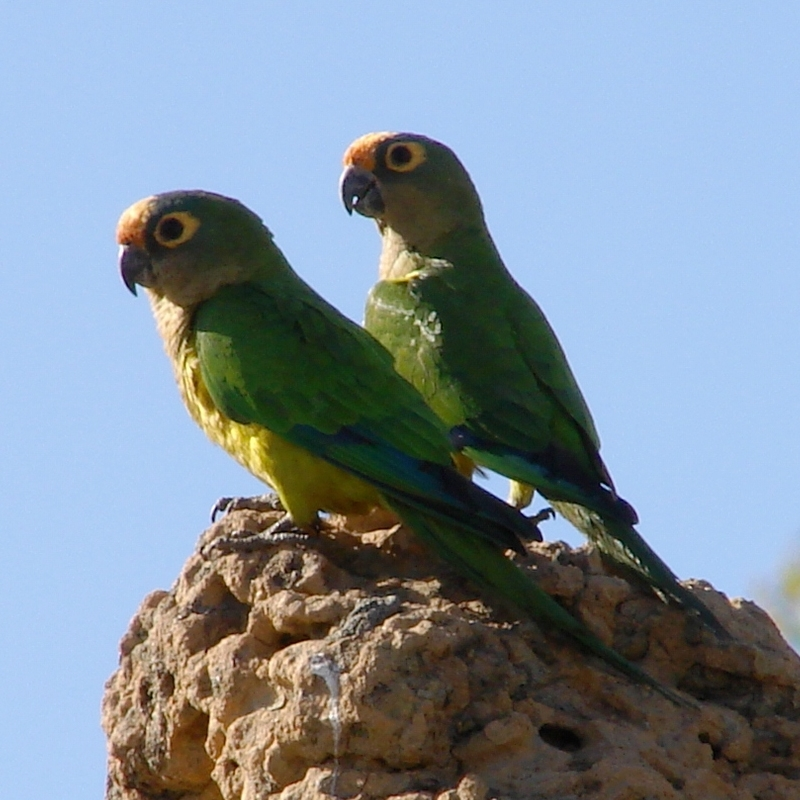
- Peach-fronted parakeet (Eupsittula aurea) on a termite mound in Brazil

Scientific classification
- Kingdom: Animalia
- Phylum: Chordata
- Class: Aves
- Order: Psittaciformes
- Family: Psittacidae
- Tribe: Arini
- Genus: Eupsittula; Bonaparte, 1853

Type species
- Psittacus petzii = Psittacus canicularis Leiblin, 1832

Species
- Eupsittula nana Eupsittula canicularis Eupsittula aurea Eupsittula pertinax Eupsittula cactorum

= Eupsittula =

Genus of birds

Eupsittula is a genus of South and Middle American parakeets in the tribe Arini. Until 2013, all the species were believed to belong to the genus Aratinga. Some of the Eupsittula species are kept in aviculture or as companion parrots, where they are commonly known as conures.

== Taxonomy ==
The genus Eupsittula was introduced in 1853 by the French naturalist Charles Lucien Bonaparte with the orange-fronted parakeet as the type species. The genus name combines the Ancient Greek eu meaning "good" with the Modern Latin psittula meaning "little parrot".

The genus contains five species.

Genus Eupsittula – Bonaparte, 1853 – five species
Common name	Scientific name and subspecies	Range	Size and ecology	IUCN status and estimated population
peach-fronted parakeet	Eupsittula aurea (Gmelin, 1788)	eastern Brazil, Bolivia, Paraguay, far northern Argentina and southern Suriname (Sipaliwini savanna).	Size: Habitat: Diet:	LC
Caatinga parakeet, or cactus parakeet	Eupsittula cactorum (Kuhl, 1820) Two subspecies: E. c. cactorum (Kuhl, 1820); E. c. caixana (Spix, 1824)	Caatinga region in north-eastern Brazil.	Size: Habitat: Diet:	LC
orange-fronted parakeet, or half-moon conure	Eupsittula canicularis (Linnaeus, 1758) Three subspecies: E. c. clarae (Moore, R.T., 1937); E. c. eburnirostrum (Lesson, R., 1842); E. c. canicularis (Linnaeus, 1758)	western Mexico to Costa Rica.	Size: Habitat: Diet:	VU
olive-throated parakeet	Eupsittula nana (Vigors, 1830) Three subspecies: E. n. vicinalis Bangs & Penard, T.E., 1919; E. n. astec (Souancé, 1857); E. n. nana (Vigors, 1830)	Jamaica, Mexico, and Central America; introduced to the Dominican Republic	Size: Habitat: Diet:	NT
brown-throated parakeet, or St. Thomas conure	Eupsittula pertinax (Linnaeus, 1758) Fourteen subspecies: E. p. ocularis (Sclater, P.L. & Salvin, 1865); E. p. aeruginosa (Linnaeus, 1758); E. p. griseipecta (Meyer de Schauensee, 1950); E. p. lehmanni (Dugand, 1943); E. p. arubensis (Hartert, E., 1892); E. p. pertinax (Linnaeus, 1758); E. p. xanthogenia (Bonaparte, 1850); E. p. tortugensis (Cory, 1909); E. p. margaritensis Cory, 1918; E. p. venezuelae (Zimmer, J.T. & Phelps, 1951); E. p. surinama (Zimmer, J.T. & Phelps, 1951); E. p. chrysophrys (Swainson, 1838); E. p. chrysogenys (Massena & Souancé, 1854); E. p. paraensis (Sick, 1959)	Colombia, Venezuela, the Guianas, Trinidad and Tobago, the ABC islands in the Netherlands Antilles, and northern Brazil (mainly the Rio Negro/Branco region)	Size: Habitat: Diet:	LC
