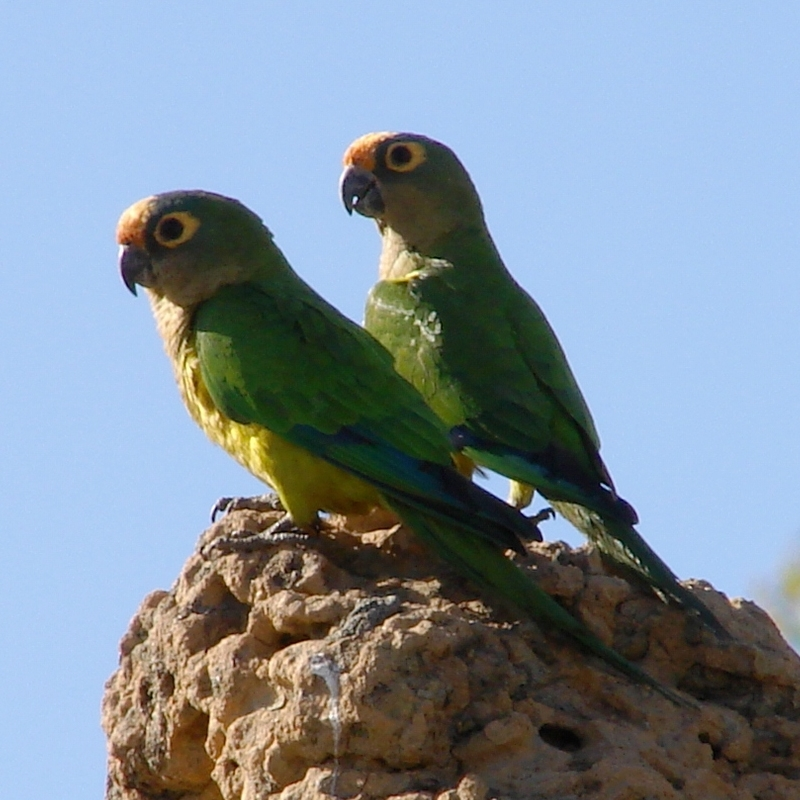
- On a termite mound in Minas Gerais, Brazil

Conservation status
- Least Concern (IUCN 3.1)
- CITES Appendix II

Scientific classification
- Kingdom: Animalia
- Phylum: Chordata
- Class: Aves
- Order: Psittaciformes
- Family: Psittacidae
- Genus: Eupsittula
- Species: E. aurea

Binomial name
- Eupsittula aurea (Gmelin, JF, 1788)

Synonyms
- Psittacus aureus (protonym)

= Peach-fronted parakeet =

Species of bird

The peach-fronted parakeet (Eupsittula aurea), known as the peach-fronted conure in aviculture, is a species of bird in subfamily Arinae of the family Psittacidae, the African and New World parrots. It is found in Argentina, Bolivia, Brazil, Paraguay, Peru, and Suriname.

== Taxonomy and systematics ==
The peach-fronted parakeet was formally described in 1788 by the German naturalist Johann Friedrich Gmelin in his revised and expanded edition of Carl Linnaeus's Systema Naturae. He placed it with all the other parrots in the genus Psittacus and coined the binomial name Psittacus aurius. Gmelin based his description on earlier publications. In 1758 the English naturalist George Edwards had described and illustrated the species with the English name "golden-crowned parakeet". The peach-fronted parakeet is now one of five parakeets placed in the genus Eupsittula that was introduced in 1853 by the French naturalist Charles Lucien Bonaparte. The genus name combines the Ancient Greek eu meaning "good" with the Modern Latin psittula meaning "little parrot". The specific epithet aurea is Latin meaning "golden". The species is monotypic; no subspecies are recognized.

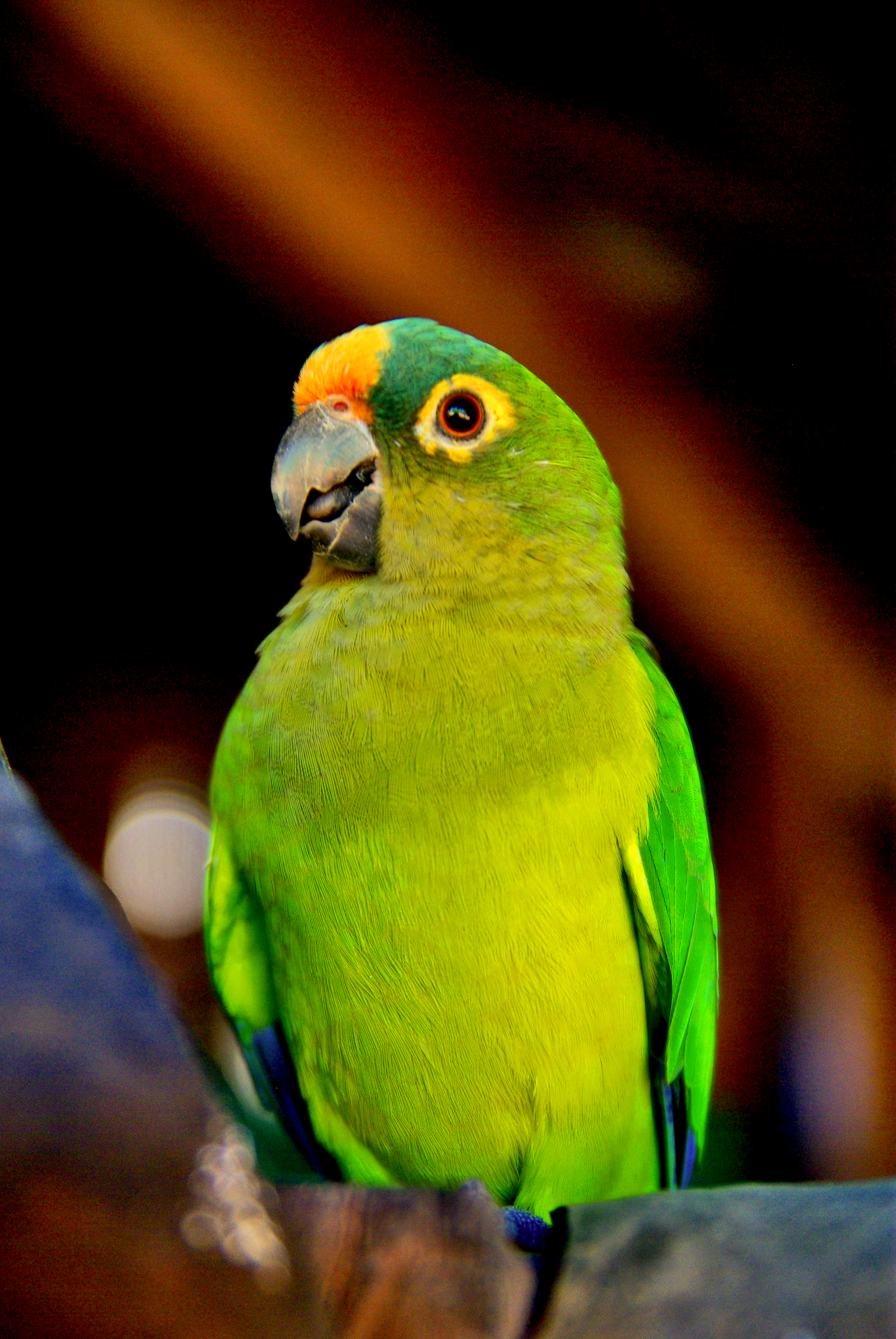

== Description ==
The peach-fronted parakeet is 23 to 28 cm (9.1 to 11 in) long and weighs 74 to 94 g (2.6 to 3.3 oz). The sexes are the same. Adults have a peachy orange forehead (the "front") and forecrown; their hindcrown is dull blue. Bare yellow skin surrounds their eye. Their nape, upperparts, and tail are dull green. Their cheeks and throat are pale olive-brown that transitions through their breast and belly to a greenish yellow vent and undertail coverts. Their wings are mostly green on top and yellow green on the bottom, with greenish blue flight feathers. Immature birds are similar to adults but have less orange and blue on their head.

== Distribution and habitat ==
The peach-fronted parakeet is found from extreme southern Suriname south through most of the eastern half of Brazil to eastern Bolivia, extreme southeastern Peru, central and eastern Paraguay, and slightly into northeastern Argentina. It inhabits a variety of landscapes from semi-open to wooded, including Mauritia palm groves, cerrado, gallery forest, campo rupestre (a savanna-like grassland with shrubs and scattered trees), and urban areas.

== Behavior ==
=== Movement ===
The peach-fronted parakeet appears to make local movements according to the availability of food, but has no regular movement pattern.

=== Feeding ===
The peach-fronted parakeet does much foraging on the ground. Its primary food is seeds from a wide variety of plants; it also feeds on termites and insect larvae. It feeds in agricultural fields, both before harvest and to glean after harvest.

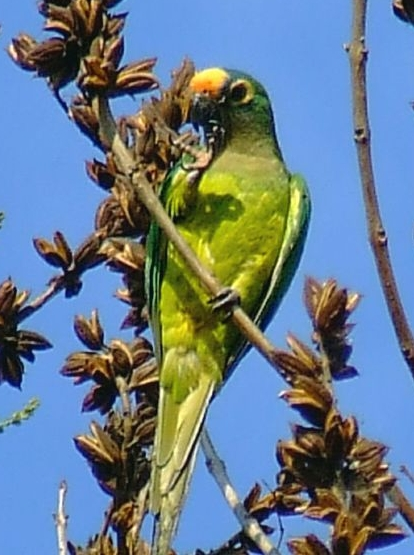

=== Breeding ===
The peach-fronted parakeet breeds in June and July in Peru and between September and December in central Brazil; its season elsewhere has not been defined. It typically excavates its nest in a termitarium, both those on the ground and in trees. The clutch size is two to four eggs. In captivity the incubation period is 23 days and fledging occurs 48 days after hatch.

=== Vocalization ===
The peach-fronted parakeet's call is a "rolling 'vreet vreet-vreet-vreet-vreet', irregularly breaking from low to very high pitch."

== Status ==
The IUCN has assessed the peach-fronted parakeet as being of Least Concern. It has a very large range and though its population size is not known it is believed to be stable. The only apparent major threat is the pet trade. It is considered common in Suriname and abundant in Paraguay. In Brazil it is the most common species of Eupsittula parakeet; and may benefit from forest clearance for agriculture. However, it "suffers extensively from taking of nestlings for sale as pets, with very high mortality in rearing stages."
