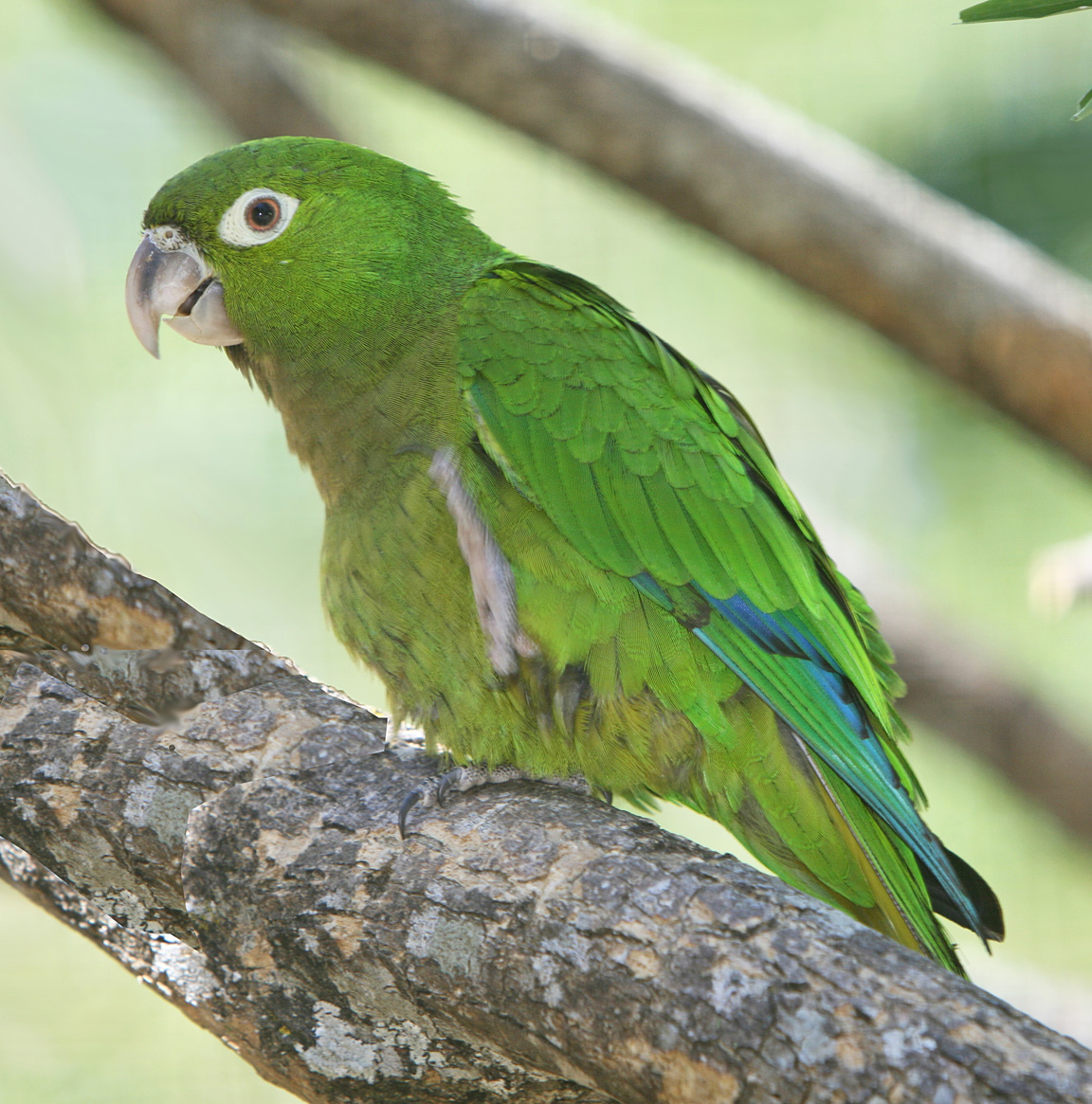
- Eupsittula nana nana

Conservation status
- Near Threatened (IUCN 3.1)(nana)

- Least Concern (IUCN 3.1)(astec)

Scientific classification
- Kingdom: Animalia
- Phylum: Chordata
- Class: Aves
- Order: Psittaciformes
- Family: Psittacidae
- Genus: Eupsittula
- Species: E. nana

Binomial name
- Eupsittula nana (Vigors, 1830)

Synonyms
- Aratinga nana; Aratinga astec; Eupsittula astec

= Olive-throated parakeet =

Species of bird

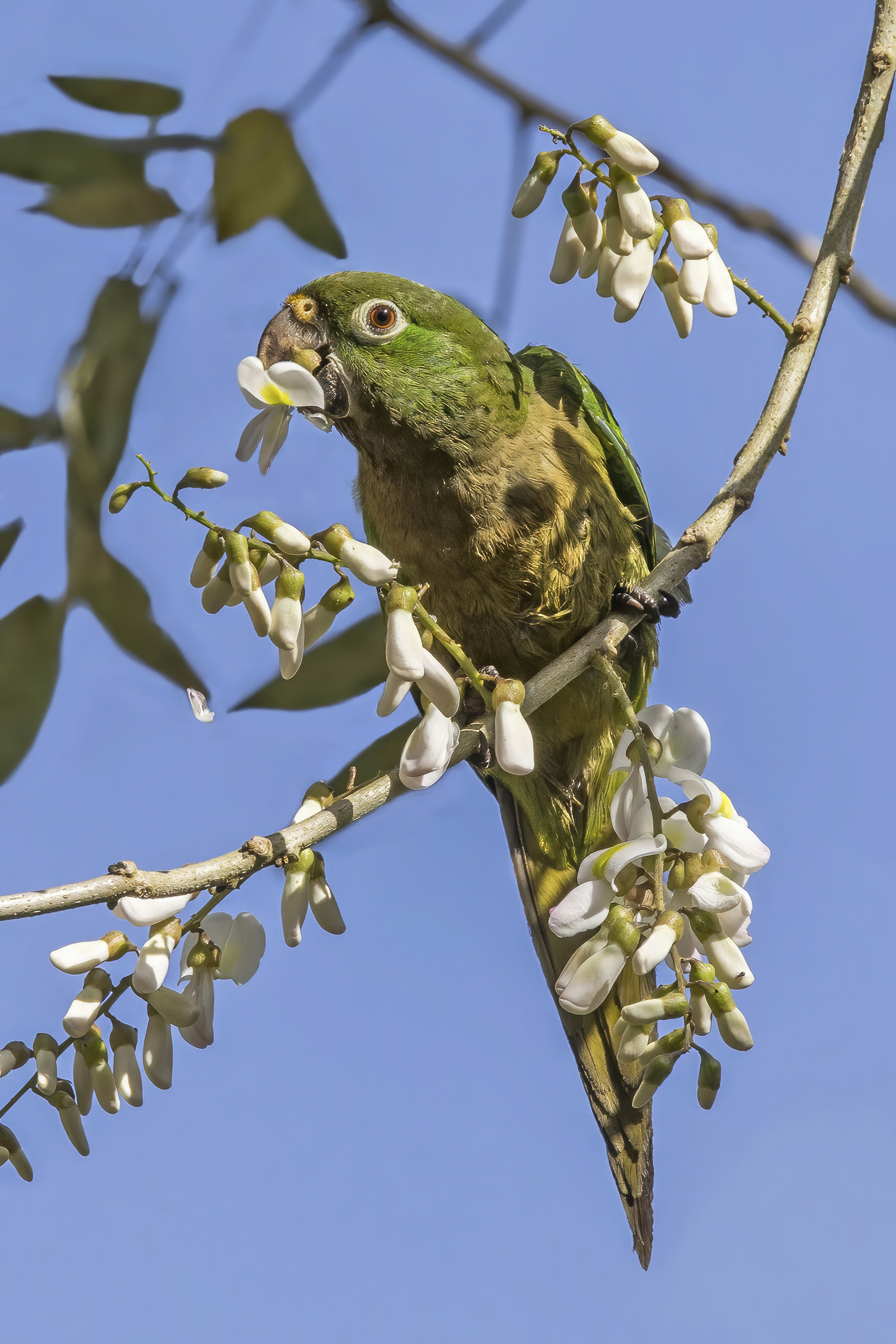
feeding on madre cacao (Gliricidia) in Belize

The olive-throated parakeet (Eupsittula nana), also known as the olive-throated conure in aviculture, is a species of bird in subfamily Arinae of the family Psittacidae, the African and New World parrots. It is found from Mexico to Costa Rica and in Jamaica; it has been introduced to the Dominican Republic on Hispaniola.

== Taxonomy and systematics ==
The olive-throated parakeet was long included in genus Aratinga but since about 2014 has been in Eupsittula. The American Ornithological Society, the International Ornithological Committee, and the Clements taxonomy assign these three subspecies to the olive-throated parakeet:

- E. n. vicinalis Bangs & Penard, T.E., 1919
- E. n. astec (Souancé, 1857)
- E. n. nana (Vigors, 1830)

BirdLife International's Handbook of the Birds of the World (HBW) treats E. n. astec as the species "Aztec parakeet" with E. n. vicinalis as a subspecies of it. It treats E. n. nana by itself as the "Jamaican parakeet".

This article follows the single species, three-subspecies, model.

== Description ==
The "Jamaican" olive-throated parakeet E. n. nana is the nominate subspecies; it is 22 to 26 cm (8.7 to 10 in) long and weighs about 72 to 85 g (2.5 to 3.0 oz). The "Aztec" olive-throated parakeet is 21.5 to 25 cm (8.5 to 9.8 in) long and weighs about 85 g (3.0 oz). The sexes are alike. Adults of the nominate subspecies have a mainly dark green head and upperparts with yellowish ear coverts and rump. Bare white skin surrounds their eye. Their throat and breast are olive-brown that becomes olive on the belly and vent. Their wings are mostly green with dull blue on the upper side of the flight feathers and gray on their underside. Their tail's upper surface is green and its underside is yellowish. Their bill is browish horn color with a paler tip, their iris yellow to orange, and their legs blackish gray. Immature birds are similar to adults.

Subspecies E. n. astec ("Aztec" in part) has paler olive-brown underparts, especially on the belly and vent. Subspecies E. n. vicinalis is slightly larger than astec and is brighter green above and greener below.

== Distribution and habitat ==
The olive-throated parakeet has two widely disjunct populations. The nominate subspecies E. n. nana is found naturally in Jamaica and has been introduced to the Dominican Republic. Subspecies E. n. vicinalis is found in northeastern Mexico from Tamaulipas to northern Veracruz. E. n. astec is found on the Caribbean side from Veracruz through Guatemala, Belize, Honduras, Nicaragua, and Costa Rica into western Panama's Bocas del Toro Province.

The olive-throated parakeet's principal habitat is deciduous woodlands. It also inhabits the interior and edges of humid forest, riparian areas, scrublands, and more open landscapes such as plantations, clearings with trees, and gardens. It occurs in pine stands throughout, a habitat which is heavily used in the Dominican Republic. In elevation it reaches 1,000 m (3,300 ft) in Mexico, 1,100 m (3,600 ft) in Honduras, 700 m (2,300 ft) in Costa Rica, and 1,500 m (4,900 ft) in Jamaica.

== Behavior ==
=== Movement ===
The nominate subspecies of the olive-throated parakeet makes some movements between moist and dryer habitats in response to the availability of food. The other two subspecies are generally considered to be year-round residents, but E. n. astec visits Caye Caulker off Belize in winter.

=== Feeding ===
A major part of the olive-throated parakeet's diet is fig fruits (Ficus); other fruits, leaves, and flowers are also eaten. On Jamaica the species is typically seen in flocks of up to about 20 individuals. On that island it is a crop pest, feeding especially on maize but also on corn and cultivated fruits. On the mainland, flocks can have 50 or more members and sometimes include Finsch's parakeet (Psittacara finschi).

=== Breeding ===
The nominate subspecies of the olive-throated parakeet nests between March and June in Jamaica and somewhat earlier in the Dominican Republic. It nests between January and April in Costa Rica and April and May in Belize and Guatemala. In all areas it nests in cavities in termitaria, which it usually excavates itself. It has nested in tree holes in Jamaica. The clutch size is three to five eggs. The incubation period, time to fledging, and details of parental care are not known.

=== Vocalization ===
The olive-throated parakeet's vocalizations differ little among the subspecies. Their calls are "a sharp, grating "krik-krik-krik-krik" or raucous "krrieh krrie krreah"."

== Status ==
The IUCN follows HBW taxonomy and therefore has separately assessed the "Jamaican" and "Aztec" olive-throated parakeets. The Jamaican population is considered Near Threatened. It has a confined range, and its estimated population of 10,000 to 20,000 mature individuals is believed to be decreasing. "Habitat loss and fragmentation are perhaps the greatest on-going threats". Deforestation is not high but coastal development for residences, tourism, and industry is significant. Some small-scale poaching for food and the pet trade contribute to the decline. It is considered common and widespread in Jamaica but is persecuted as a crop pest. The population in the Dominican Republic is apparently increasing. The "Aztec" olive-throated parakeet is assessed as being of Least Concern. It has a large range but its population size is not known and is believed to be decreasing. No immediate threats have been identified. It is locally common to abundant and occurs in several protected areas, though some sub-populations have declined due to habitat loss. The species as a whole is listed in CITES Appendix II.
