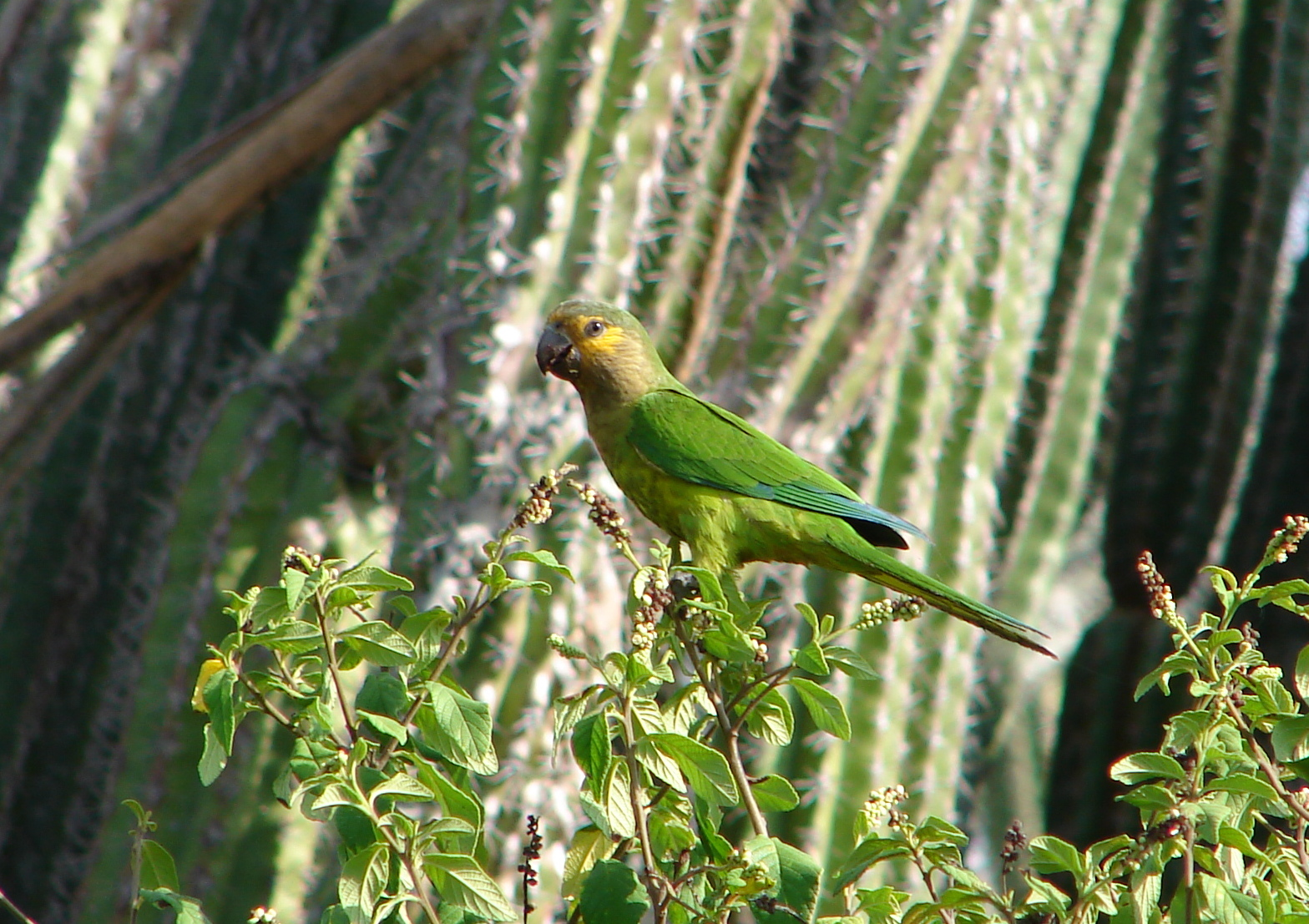
- Subspecies E. p. arubensis in Aruba

Conservation status
- Least Concern (IUCN 3.1)
- CITES Appendix II

Scientific classification
- Kingdom: Animalia
- Phylum: Chordata
- Class: Aves
- Order: Psittaciformes
- Family: Psittacidae
- Genus: Eupsittula
- Species: E. pertinax

Binomial name
- Eupsittula pertinax (Linnaeus, 1758)

Synonyms
- Psittacus pertinax Linnaeus, 1758; Aratinga pertinax Linnaeus, 1758

= Brown-throated parakeet =

Species of bird

The brown-throated parakeet (Eupsittula pertinax), also known as the St. Thomas conure or brown-throated conure in aviculture, is a species of bird in the subfamily Arinae of the family Psittacidae, the African and New World parrots. It is found in Costa Rica, Panama, the northern mainland of South America, and islands off the South American coast.

== Taxonomy and systematics ==
The brown-throated parakeet was formally described in 1758 by the Swedish naturalist Carl Linnaeus in the tenth edition of his Systema Naturae. He placed it with all the other parrots in the genus Psittacus and coined the binomial name Psittacus pertinax. The brown-throated parakeet is now one of five species placed in the genus Eupsittula that was introduced in 1853 by the French naturalist Charles Lucien Bonaparte. The genus name combines the Ancient Greek eu meaning "good" with the Modern Latin psittula meaning "little parrot". The specific epithet pertinax is Latin meaning "tenacious" or "persistent".

These 14 subspecies are recognized; some of them are island endemics:

- E. p. aeruginosa (Linnaeus, 1758)
- E. p. arubensis (Hartert, E., 1892)
- E. p. chrysogenys (Massena & Souancé, 1854)
- E. p. chrysophrys (Swainson, 1838)
- E. p. griseipecta (Meyer de Schauensee, 1950)
- E. p. lehmanni (Dugand, 1943)
- E. p. margaritensis Cory, 1918
- E. p. ocularis (Sclater, P.L. & Salvin, 1865)
- E. p. paraensis (Sick, 1959)
- E. p. pertinax (Linnaeus, 1758)
- E. p. surinama (Zimmer, J.T. & Phelps, 1951)
- E. p. tortugensis (Cory, 1909)
- E. p. venezuelae (Zimmer, J.T. & Phelps, 1951)
- E. p. xanthogenia (Bonaparte, 1850)

Subspecies E. p. ocularis has sometimes been treated as a separate species, the "Veraguas parakeet".

== Description ==
The brown-throated parakeet is 23 to 28 cm (9.1 to 11 in) long and weighs 76 to 102 g (2.7 to 3.6 oz). The sexes are alike. Adults of the nominate subspecies E. p. pertinax have a yellow forehead, face, and chin. Their crown, nape, and upperparts are green. Their breast is dull olive and their belly grass green with an orange patch in its center. Their wings are mostly green with dullish blue edges and tips on the flight feathers; their tail feathers are also green with dullish blue edges and tips. Immature birds have very little yellow.

The other subspecies differ from the nominate thus:

- E. p. aeruginosa – buff forehead and orange-yellow crown and nape
- E. p. arubensis – yellow face with some brown mixed in
- E. p. chrysogenys – darker than all others and all a green forehead and crown
- E. p. chrysophrys – whitish forehead and rich brown face
- E. p. griseipecta – buff forehead, orange-yellow crown and nape, and olive-gray cheeks and breast
- E. p. lehmanni – buff forehead and orange-yellow crown, nape, and around the eye
- E. p. margaritensis – whitish forehead and olive-brown face
- E. p. ocularis: olive-brown face
- E. p. paraensis – darker than all but chrysogenys with an orange-yellow belly
- E. p. surinama – whitish forehead, rich brown face with orange below the eye, and greener breast
- E. p. tortugensis – buff forehead and orange-yellow crown, nape, and sides of the head
- E. p. venezuelae – whitish forehead, olive-brown face, and yellowish upperparts
- E. p. xanthogenia – orange-yellow crown and nape

== Distribution and habitat ==
The subspecies of the brown-throated parakeet are found thus:

- E. p. aeruginosa – northern Colombia and Zulia in northwestern Venezuela
- E. p. arubensis – Aruba, Leeward Antilles
- E. p. chrysogenys – the Rio Negro's middle basin in northwestern Brazil
- E. p. chrysophrys – Bolívar state in southeastern Venezuela, southwestern Guiana, and Roraima in adjacent northern Brazil
- E. p. griseipecta – Sinú Valley of northeastern Colombia; possibly extinct
- E. p. lehmanni – eastern Colombia and Amazonas state in southwestern Venezuela
- E. p. margaritensis – Margarita Island off northern Venezuela
- E. p. paraensis – the Tapajós and Cururu river basins in Pará, north-central Brazil
- E. p. pertinax – Curaçao, Leeward Antilles
- E. p. ocularis – southwestern Costa Rica, and Panama from Costa Rica to Panamá Province
- E. p. surinama – northeastern Venezuela through the Guianas
- E. p. tortugensis – La Tortuga Island off northern Venezuela
- E. p. venezuelae – northern and central Venezuela
- E. p. xanthogenia – Bonaire, Leeward Antilles

The nominate subspecies of the brown-throated parakeet was introduced in Saint Thomas, U.S. Virgin Islands and was established by the 1860s. From there it spread to Culebra Island, Tortola, and Puerto Rico but had been extirpated from them by about 1982. More recent sightings in Puerto Rico and those in Florida, the British Virgin Islands, Anguilla, Dominica, and San Andrés are known or suspected to be of escaped or released cage birds rather than deliberate introductions or natural arrivals.

The species is a non-breeding visitor to Trinidad.

The brown-throated parakeet inhabits a wide variety of landscapes including savannas, arid scrublands, mangroves, tropical deciduous forests, gallery forests, evergreen forests, and cultivated areas and pastures with some remaining trees. In Colombia, it reaches an elevation of 2,600 m (8,500 ft) but is found mostly below 1,200 m (3,900 ft) elsewhere. It is also widely distributed in Venezuela, but shows preference for areas with open vegetation with higher probabilities of occurrence in the savannas of the Llanos bioregion and the arid scrublands of northwestern Venezuela.

== Behavior ==
=== Movement ===
Some populations on the mainland make seasonal movements and others are somewhat nomadic to follow the availability of food.

=== Feeding ===
The brown-throated parakeet's diet includes seeds, fruits, nuts, flowers, leaves, and sometimes insects. A study in Venezuela found that up to 70% of its food in the study area came from human-planted, rather than wild, sources. The species is a significant crop pest, especially on maize and other field crops in Colombia and Venezuela, and in fruit plantations in the Leeward Antilles. It has been observed feeding on cactus. The species typically forages in pairs or small flocks. Flocks will call in flight, and if an actively foraging flock responds, the others may join it.

=== Breeding ===
The brown-throated parakeet's nesting season varies throughout its range. It may nest at almost any time of year in Suriname and the Antilles, and from February to April in Colombia and Venezuela. It usually excavates a cavity in a nest of an arboreal termite, often one from the genus Nasutitermes. Furthermore, it also nests in natural cavities in a tree, on a cliff face, or in an earthen bank. Often several pairs will nest in a single rotten tree. The clutch size is two to seven eggs. In captivity, the incubation period is 23 days. In the wild, the time to fledge is 36 to 37 days.

=== Vocalization ===
The brown-throated parakeet is very vocal. Its flight calls "include high-pitched screeching and harsh grating 'scraart scraart' cries, rapidly repeated." It also makes "shorter, bisyllabic 'tchrit tchrit' and 'cherr cheedit'" calls, and from a perch "similar calls and chattering notes."

Brown-throated parakeet contact calls show character shifts between different locations, and by most measures the calls from islands are more variable. These changes in island parakeets' calls may be a response to both the windy environment with poor sound transmission, and the isolation of the populations living on small islands.

== Status ==
The IUCN has assessed the brown-throated parakeet as being of Least Concern. It has a very large range and its estimated population of at least five million mature individuals is believed to be stable. No immediate threats have been identified. It is the most numerous parrot in much of its range. Subspecies E. p. tortugensis, however, appears to be in decline, and the populations in mainland Venezuela are persecuted because they feed on crops.

Nest poaching is a concern in island populations, and in Venezuela both young and adult individuals are locally traded as cage birds for the pet market. However, compared to other species of psittacids, it is not very frequent in global wildlife trade.

== Gallery ==
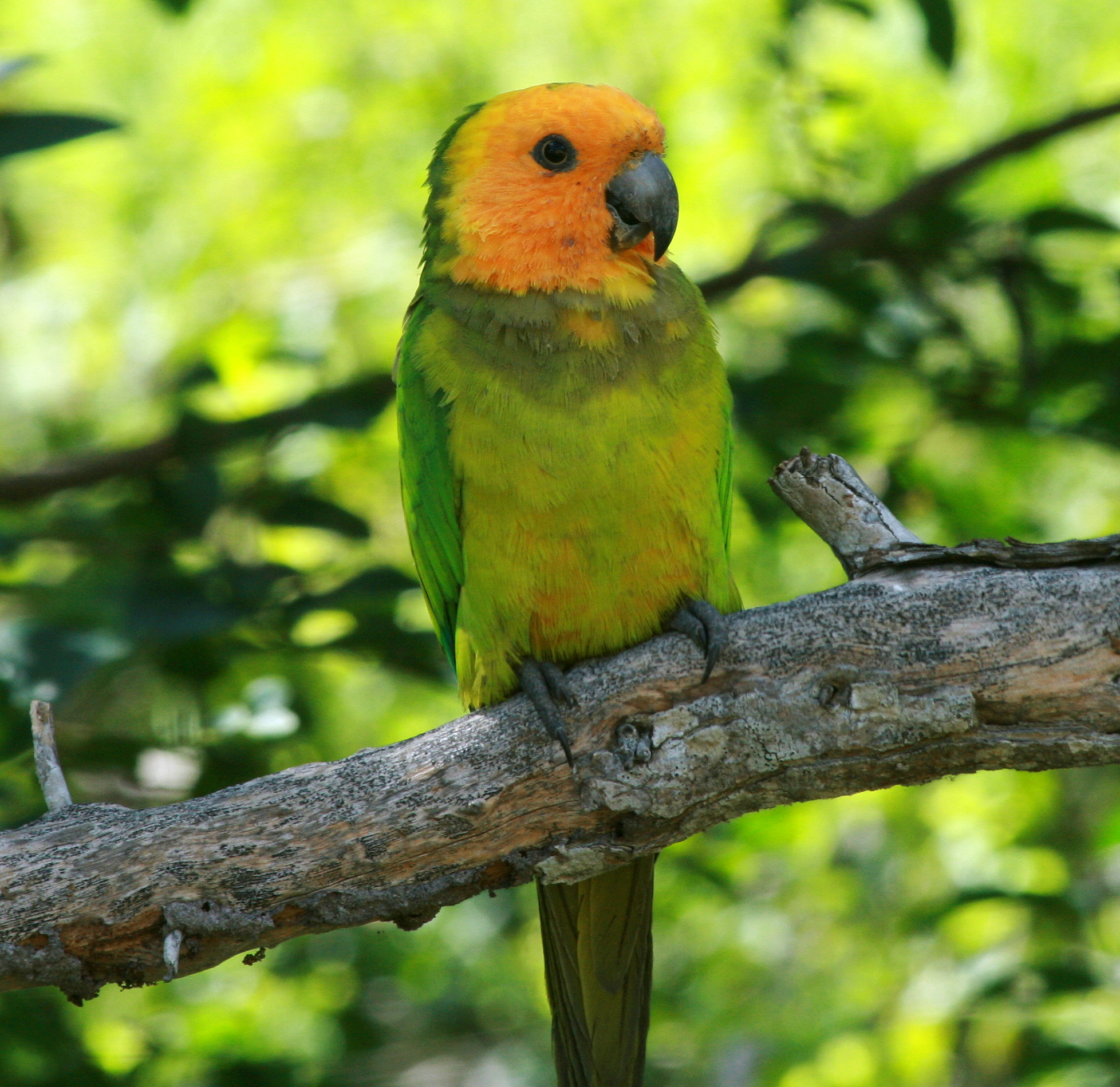
E. p. xanthogenia – on the island of Bonaire, Netherlands Antilles

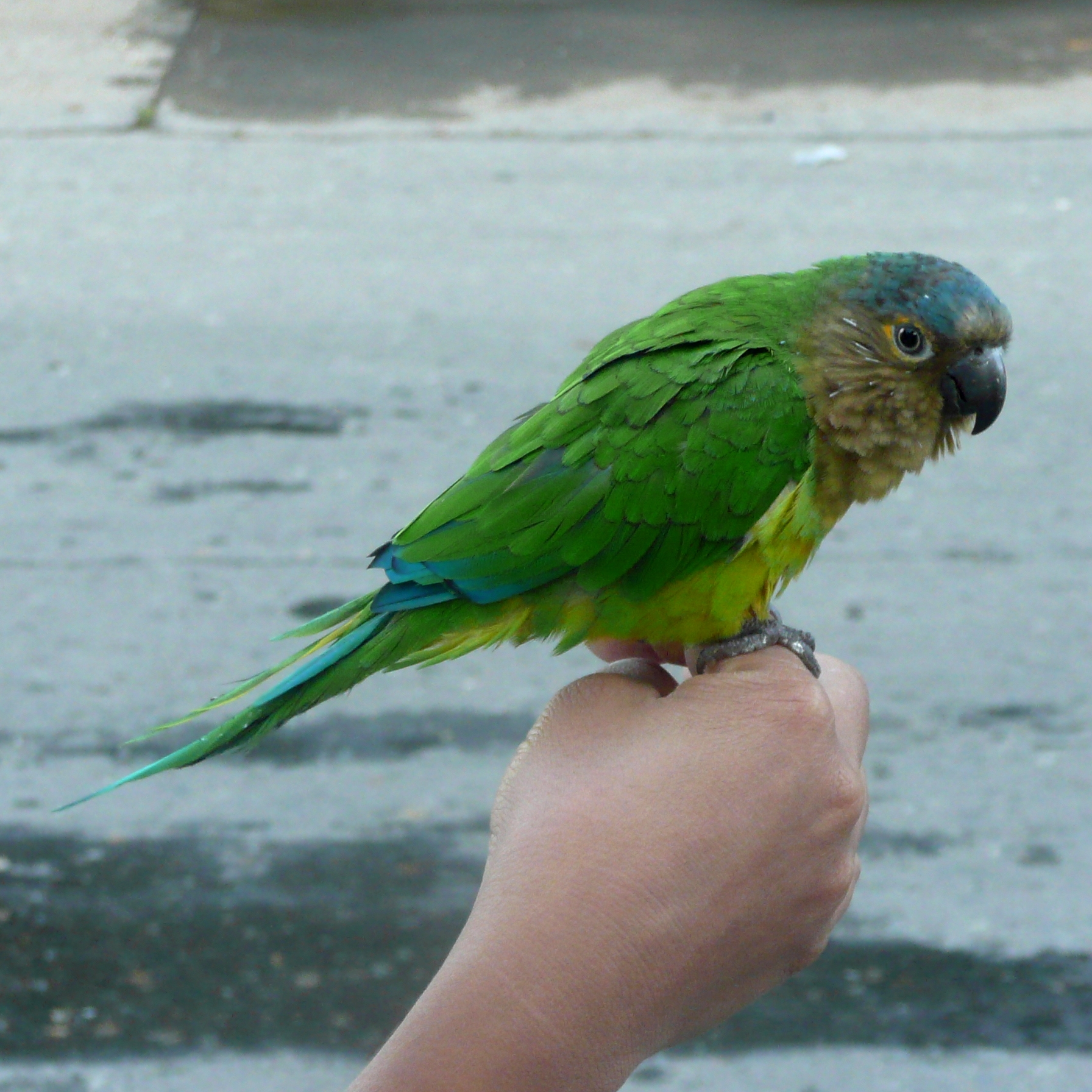
E. p. venezuelae – a pet in Cagua, Aragua, Venezuela

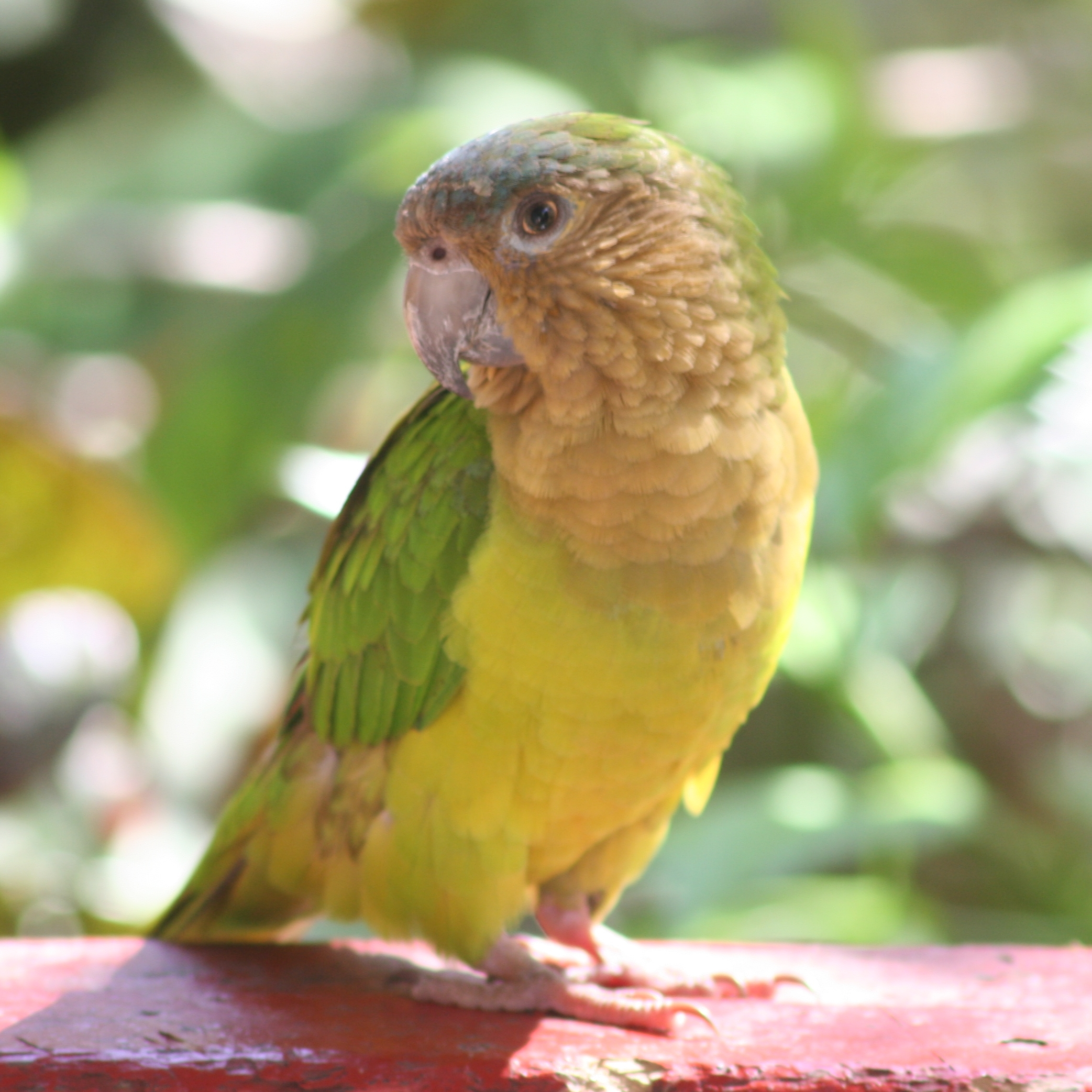
E. p. aeruginosa – in the Caribbean Region of Colombia

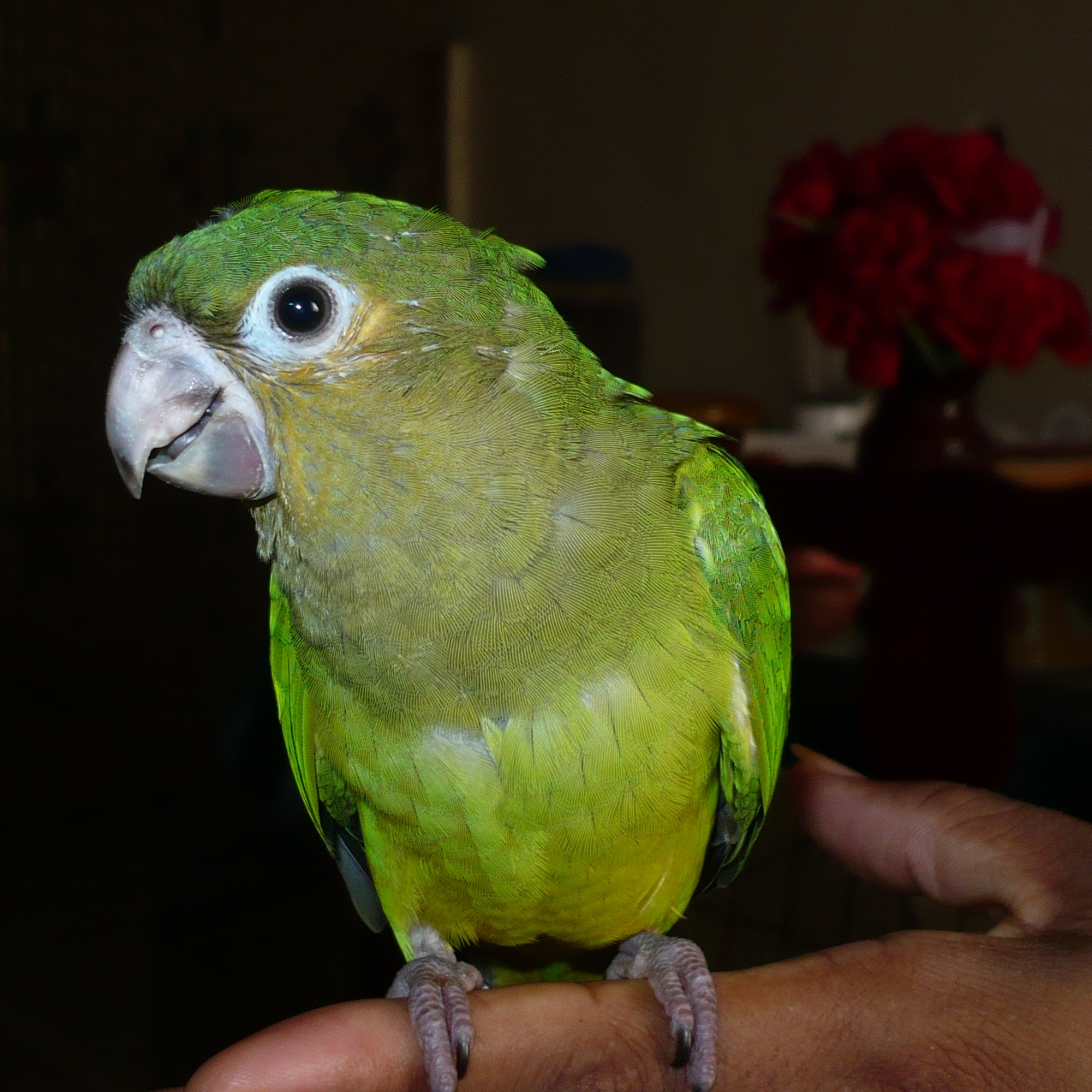
E. p. ocularis – a juvenile kept as a pet in Panama

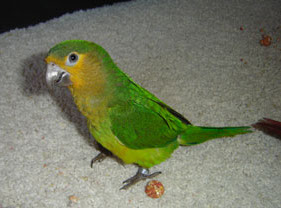
A pet parrot
