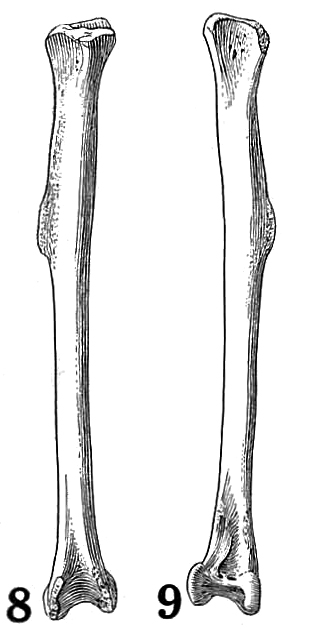
- Holotype left tibiotarsus in two views

Conservation status
- Extinct (year unknown)

Scientific classification
- Kingdom: Animalia
- Phylum: Chordata
- Class: Aves
- Order: Psittaciformes
- Family: Psittacidae
- Genus: Ara
- Species: †A. autocthones

Binomial name
- †Ara autocthones Wetmore, 1937
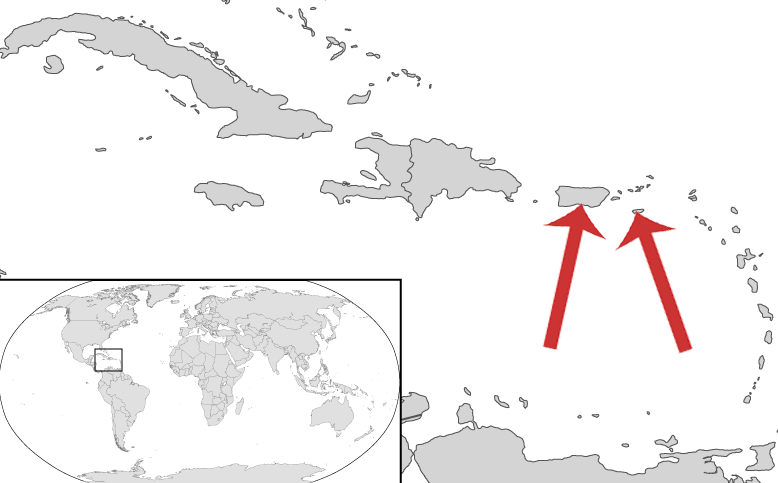
- Red arrows indicate locations on Puerto Rico and St. Croix where remains of this macaw have been found.

Synonyms
- Ara autochthones Olson, 1978 (lapsus)

= St. Croix macaw =

St. Croix macaw Temporal range: Late Holocene

Species of extinct macaw

The St. Croix macaw (Ara autocthones) or Puerto Rican macaw is an extinct species of macaw whose remains have been found on the Caribbean islands of St. Croix and Puerto Rico. It was described in 1937 based on a tibiotarsus leg bone unearthed from a kitchen midden at a pre-Columbian site on St. Croix. A second specimen consisting of various bones from a similar site on Puerto Rico was described in 2008, while a coracoid from Montserrat may belong to this or another extinct species of macaw. The St. Croix macaw is one of 13 extinct macaw species that have been proposed to have lived on the Caribbean islands. Macaws were frequently transported long distances by humans in prehistoric and historical times, so it is impossible to know whether species known only from bones or accounts were native or imported.

As it is only known from bones, the St. Croix macaw's color is not known. Extant macaws can generally be grouped in either large-body or small-body size clusters. Yet, the bones of the St. Croix macaw are intermediate in size between the two, and it was slightly larger than the extinct Cuban macaw (Ara tricolor). Only the blue-throated macaw (Ara glaucogularis) and Lear's macaw (Anodorhynchus leari) are similar in size. It differed from other macaws in various skeletal details and shared several features with only the genus Ara. Like other macaw species in the Caribbean, the St. Croix macaw is believed to have been driven to extinction by humans, as indicated by the fact that its remains were found in kitchen middens.

== Taxonomy ==
In 1934, the archeologist Lewis J. Korn (working under the Museum of the American Indian) excavated a kitchen midden (a dump for domestic waste) at a site near Concordia on the southwestern coast of St. Croix, one of the Virgin Islands in the Caribbean Sea. The midden was located 370 m (400 yd) inland from the beach, and its depth was around 76 cm (30 in). Bones of mammals, birds, turtles, and fish were obtained from the bottom of the deposit, with bird bones being concentrated at the mid-level. The exact age of the material could not be determined, but since no European origin objects were found in the deposit, it was assumed to be pre-Columbian, between 500 and 800 years old. 23 species of birds were represented among the well-preserved bones, some of which were extinct. In 1937, the ornithologist Alexander Wetmore identified several species among these bones, including a left tibiotarsus (lower leg bone) of an immature macaw, which was unexpected since no such birds were previously known from St. Croix.

Specimen of the extinct Cuban macaw, the only other Caribbean species of macaw described based on physical remains

Wetmore made the tibiotarsus the holotype specimen of a new macaw species, which he placed in the genus Ara, as Ara autocthones. The specific name is from the Ancient Greek αὐτόχθων (autochthon), meaning native or aborigine. The holotype is housed along with the other bones found at the U.S. National Museum of Natural History, cataloged as USNM 483530. Though numerous other now-extinct macaws had been described from the Caribbean based on old accounts alone, the only other species described based on physical remains at the time was the Cuban macaw (Ara tricolor), which was known from skins. Though Wetmore conceded that many uncertainties were surrounding the bone, especially regarding its affinities to other Caribbean macaws, he thought it appropriate to designate it as a new species.

In 1978, the ornithologist Storrs L. Olson (using the spelling autochthones) agreed that the bone belonged to a macaw not assignable to any known species, but noted it may not have been native to St. Croix, since indigenous Caribbeans are known to have kept and traded macaws over long distances. In 1983, he indicated that if the macaw had indeed been transported, the specific name would be a misnomer. The zoologist Elizabeth S. Wing agreed in 1989 that the macaw could have been traded, but the ornithologists Matthew I. Williams and David W. Steadman stated in 2001 that given the evidence for other macaws having existed in the region, there was no reason why St. Croix could not have had an indigenous species.

In 1987, the ornithologist Edgar J. Máiz López found several associated bones of a single bird (cataloged as USNM 44834) at the Hernández Colón archeological site on the eastern bank of the Cerrillos-Bucaná river in south central Puerto Rico. The archeological site represents a pre-Columbian Saladoid-Ostionoid village of around 15,000 m^{2} (3.7 acres) in size, situated on an alluvial terrace. Both cultural and faunal remains were excavated, and the macaw remains were found in a kitchen midden deposit that has been dated to around 300 AD. The specimen consists of partial bones including the left coracoid (missing a portion of the bone's "head"), both ends of the left humerus, the upper end of the right radius, the left carpometacarpus (missing one metacarpal), the left femur (lacking the lower end), the right tibiotarsus (lacking part of the upper articular surface), upper and lower portions of the left tibiotarsus, as well as unidentified elements. In 2008, Olson and Máiz López assigned the specimen to Ara autocthones (it had been assigned to Ara sp. in 2004, indicating uncertain classification within the genus Ara), as its tibiotarsus is identical in size to the holotype.

Olson and Máiz López considered it likely that Ara autocthones was endemic to the West Indian region rather than a species transported from the mainland by Native Americans, as it is far more likely a species restricted to islands would have been driven extinct. Since they found it unlikely the bird occurred naturally on St. Croix and questioned whether it could even have occurred naturally on Puerto Rico, they considered the name autocthones "probably one of the worst possible choices" for the species. Though fossils of the parrot genera Amazona and Aratinga have been found in pre-human sites on Puerto Rico, none such belonging to macaws have been found. Olson and Máiz López conceded that macaws are unlikely to be found in cave deposits and noted that the Cuban macaw's fossils had been found in aquatic deposits. They also pointed out that various animal species were transported and kept in captivity by Native Americans – for example the Puerto Rican hutia (Isolobodon portoricensis, an extinct rodent) and the Antillean cave rail (Nesotrochis debooyi, an extinct flightless rail) were both transported to St. Croix and found in kitchen middens.

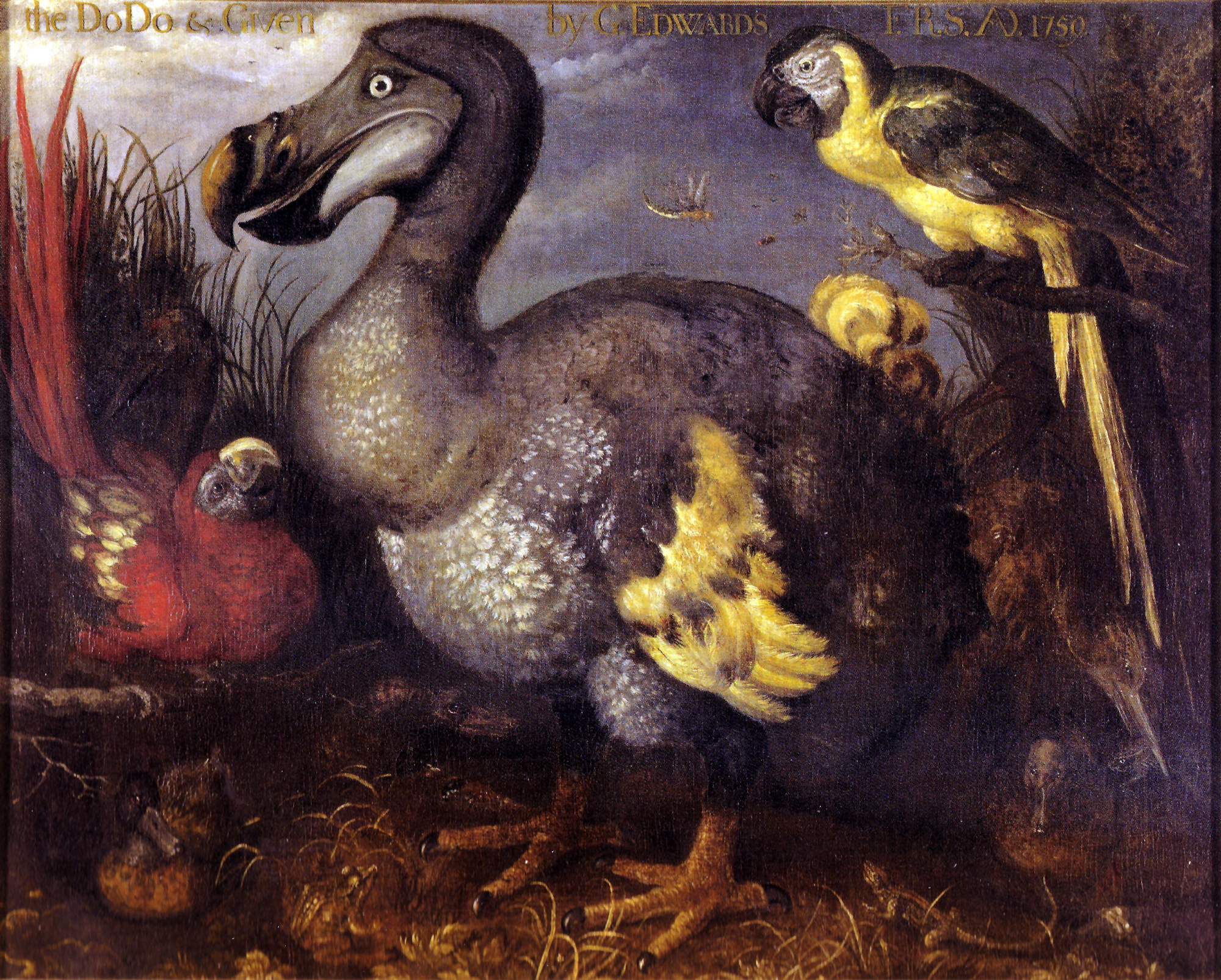
1626 painting possibly showing two other extinct Caribbean macaws next to a dodo: a Lesser Antillean macaw (left) and a Martinique macaw (right)

Olson and Máiz López pointed out that a coracoid from the island of Montserrat (reported by Williams and Steadman in 2001, and cataloged as UF 4416) could belong to the macaw of St. Croix and Puerto Rico or the Cuban macaw, as it was within the size range of the two (smaller than the former). The ornithologists James W. Wiley and Guy M. Kirwan instead suggested in 2013 that the bone from Montserrat could belong to the extinct Lesser Antillean macaw (A. guadeloupensis) of Guadeloupe. Ara autocthones has been referred to as the St. Croix macaw, but, after more remains were described from Puerto Rico, it has also been called the Puerto Rican macaw. The ornithologist Joseph M. Forshaw argued in 2017 that the latter was a more appropriate name since he found it more plausible that it naturally occurred on Puerto Rico and had been transported to the Virgin Islands.

As many as 13 now-extinct species of macaw have lived on the Caribbean islands, it has been suggested. Still, many of these were based on old descriptions or drawings and represented only hypothetical species. In addition to the St. Croix macaw, only two other endemic Caribbean macaw species are known from physical remains; the Cuban macaw is known from 19 museum skins and subfossils, and the Lesser Antillean macaw is possibly known from subfossils. Macaws are known to have been transported between the Caribbean islands and from mainland South America to the Caribbean, both in prehistoric times by Paleoamericans and in historic times by Europeans and natives. Parrots were important in the culture of native Caribbeans and were among the gifts offered to the explorer Christopher Columbus when he reached the Bahamas in 1492. Historical records of macaws on these islands, therefore, may not have represented distinct, endemic species; it is also possible that these macaws were escaped or feral birds that had been transported to the islands from elsewhere. The identity and distribution of indigenous macaws in the Caribbean are likely to be resolved only through paleontological discoveries and examination of contemporary reports and artwork.

== Description ==
Mean length and ranges of carpometacarpus (yellow squares) and tibiotarsus (green circles; red circle is the St. Croix macaw) of all macaws, with links to the species

Since only bones are known of the St. Croix macaw, nothing can be said about its coloration. While the holotype tibiotarsus appears to belong to a fully grown individual, the fact that the bone is slightly spongy at the ends indicates it was immature. This left tibiotarsus is 77.7 mm (3.06 in) in total length, 9.4 mm (0.37 in) in breadth from side to side across the lower end, and the smallest breadth from side to side of the shaft is 3.9 mm (0.15 in). Though similar to the same bone in the Cuban macaw, it is wider from side to side (comparisons between the lower ends of their tibiotarsi indicate it was a slightly larger bird). It is slender compared to those of larger macaws. The holotype tibiotarsus is intermediate in size between those of large macaws such as the scarlet macaw (Ara macao) and the military macaw (Ara militaris), and the small chestnut-fronted macaw (Ara severus). Compared to the tibiotarsi of extant macaws, the bone is more slender and has a slightly greater hindwards development of the upper end. Apart from this, its only distinguishing feature is that its dimensions do not fall within those of other known species. The slender proportions of the bone and more elongated ridges around the upper end show it is a macaw and distinguishes it from the Amazon parrots such as the large imperial amazon (Amazona imperialis).

The tibiotarsus of the assigned specimen is essentially identical in size to the holotype. It is 74.5 mm (2.93 in) from the upper articular surface, 47.2 mm (1.86 in) from the lower end of the fibular crest to the external condyle (the round prominences at the end of a bone), 11.4 mm (0.45 in) deep through the inner cnemial crest (a ridge at the front side of the head), 5.2 by 4.0 mm (0.20 by 0.16 in) wide and deep at the mid shaft, and 10.1 mm (0.40 in) wide at the lower end. The estimated length of the coracoid is 43.5 mm (1.71 in) from its head to the internal corner of the sternal facet, 26.5 mm (1.04 in) from the base of the procoracoid process to the internal corner of the sternal facet, the glenoid facet is 10.5 by 6.1 mm (0.41 by 0.24 in) wide and deep, the shaft is 5.2 by 4.4 mm (0.20 by 0.17 in) wide and deep at midpoint, and the sternal facet is 10.5 mm (0.41 in) wide. The upper width of the humerus is 19.9 mm (0.78 in), the depth through its external tuberosity is 12.8 mm (0.50 in), the depth of its head is 6.2 mm (0.24 in), the width of the lower end is about 15.5 mm (0.61 in), and the height and width of the radial condyle is 7.4 by 5.0 mm (0.29 by 0.20 in). The carpometacarpus is 55.8 mm (2.20 in) long, its upper depth is 14.3 mm (0.56 in), the trochlea (a grooved structure where bones join) is 5.7 mm (0.22 in) wide, and the shaft is 4.5 by 5.0 mm (0.18 by 0.20 in) at midpoint. The upper part of the radius is 6.0 mm (0.24 in) at its greatest diameter. The estimated length of the femur is 51.5 mm (2.03 in), its upper width is 12.5 mm (0.49 in), the depth through its trochanter is 8.2 mm (0.32 in), the head is 6.2 mm (0.24 in) deep, and the shaft is 4.9 by 5.4 mm (0.19 by 0.21 in) wide and deep at its midpoint.

Known bones of this macaw marked in red on an illustration of an unrelated parrot skeleton

Olson and Máiz López stated that extant macaws fall into two size-clusters, representing large and small species. In contrast, the St. Croix macaw was distinct in being intermediate between the two clusters, with only the blue-throated macaw (Ara glaucogularis) and Lear's macaw (Anodorhynchus leari) being similar in size. They observed that the pectoral attachment on the humerus is less excavated compared to those two macaws. In contrast, the capital groove (a groove separating two parts of the humerus's head) is wider. The head of the femur is more massive, and when seen from the back, is more excavated under the head, neck, and trochanter. In contrast, the femur's more robust shaft is similar to that of Ara but dissimilar to Anodorhynchus. The tibiotarsus is more robust with a flared lower extremity. The tibiotarsus' length is shorter than in the blue-throated macaw but longer than in Lear's macaw. In contrast, the lengths of the coracoid, carpometacarpus, and femur are smaller than in either.

Olson and Máiz López ruled out the specimen from Puerto Rico belonging to the Amazon parrots by pointing out characters found only in Ara macaws. The coracoid is more elongated and has a relatively narrow shaft, and the ventral lip of the glenoid facet (equivalent to the glenoid fossa of mammals) protrudes more. The carpometacarpus is proportionally much longer with a process on the alular metacarpal that is not curved at its upper part, while the ectepicondylar process (a bony elevation) and the attachment of pronator brevis (one of the two pronation muscles in the wing) on the humerus is placed farther upwards. The femur has a proportionally larger head, and the tibiotarsus has a narrower internal condyle and a distinctive inner cnemial crest that is more pointed and extends further upwards.

== Extinction ==
All the endemic Caribbean macaws were likely driven to extinction by humans (in prehistoric and historical times), though hurricanes and disease may have contributed. Native Caribbeans hunted macaws and held them captive for later use as food, but also as pets. Since they are known from kitchen midden deposits, the macaws from Puerto Rico and St. Croix were evidently also used for subsistence. It is likely that the St. Croix macaw became extinct due to these factors, but the date it happened is unknown.
