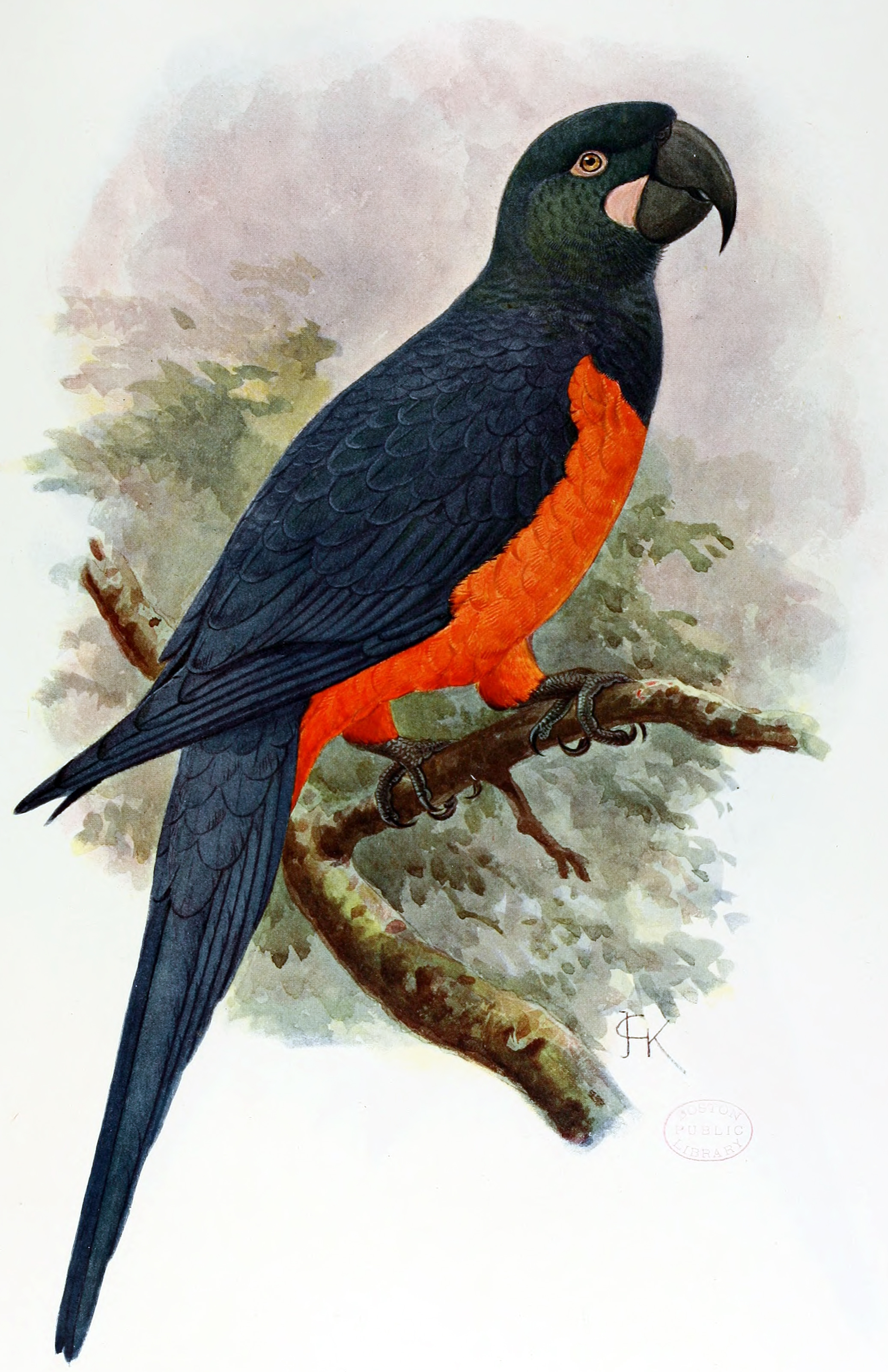
- Hypothetical 1907 life reconstruction by John Gerrard Keulemans, based on Jacques Bouton's description

Conservation status
- Not evaluated (IUCN 3.1)

Scientific classification
- Kingdom: Animalia
- Phylum: Chordata
- Class: Aves
- Order: Psittaciformes
- Family: Psittacidae
- Genus: Ara
- Species: A. martinica

Binomial name
- Ara martinica (Rothschild, 1905)
- Location of Martinique

Synonyms
- List: Anodorhynchus martinicus Rothschild, 1905; Ara martinicus Rothschild, 1907; Anodorhynchus coeruleus Rothschild, 1905; Ara erythrura Rothschild, 1907

= Martinique macaw =

Extinct species of bird

The Martinique macaw or orange-bellied macaw (Ara martinica) is a hypothetical extinct species of macaw which may have lived on the Lesser Antillean island of Martinique, in the eastern Caribbean Sea. It was scientifically described by Walter Rothschild in 1905, based on a 1630s description of blue and orange-yellow macaws by Jacques Bouton. No other evidence of its existence is known, but it may have been depicted in a 1626 painting. Some writers have suggested that the birds observed were actually blue-and-yellow macaws (Ara ararauna). The red-tailed blue-and-yellow macaw (Ara erythrura), another species named by Rothschild in 1907 based on a 1658 account, may be identical to the Martinique macaw, if either ever existed.

The Martinique macaw is one of 13 extinct macaw species that have been proposed to have lived in the Caribbean islands. Many of these species are now considered dubious; only three are known from physical remains, and there are no extant endemic macaws on the islands today. Macaws were frequently transported between the Caribbean islands and the South American mainland in both prehistoric and historic times, and it is therefore difficult to establish whether contemporaneous reports refer to imported or native species.

== Taxonomy ==
The Martinique macaw was scientifically described by the British zoologist Walter Rothschild in 1905, as a new species in the macaw genus Anodorhynchus: A. martinicus. The species was solely based on a 1630s account by the French priest Jacques Bouton of blue and orange-yellow macaws from the Lesser Antillean island of Martinique. Rothschild reclassified the species as Ara martinicus in his 1907 book, Extinct Birds, which also contained a restoration of the bird by the Dutch artist John Gerrard Keulemans. The Martinique amazon (Amazona martinicana) of the same island was also based solely on a contemporary description, and many supposedly extinct parrot species from the Caribbean islands were named based on such scant evidence.

What Bouton described is likely to remain a mystery, but various theories have been proposed. In 1906, the Italian zoologist Tommaso Salvadori noted that the Martinique macaw seemed similar to the blue-and-yellow macaw (Ara ararauna) of mainland South America, and may have been the same bird. In 1936, the Cuban scientist Mario Sánchez Roig claimed to have found a stuffed Martinique macaw specimen, which was supposed to have been collected in 1845. After examination the same year, the American ornithologist John T. Zimmer showed it to be a hoax, combining a burrowing parakeet (Cyanoliseus patagonus) with the tail of a dove.

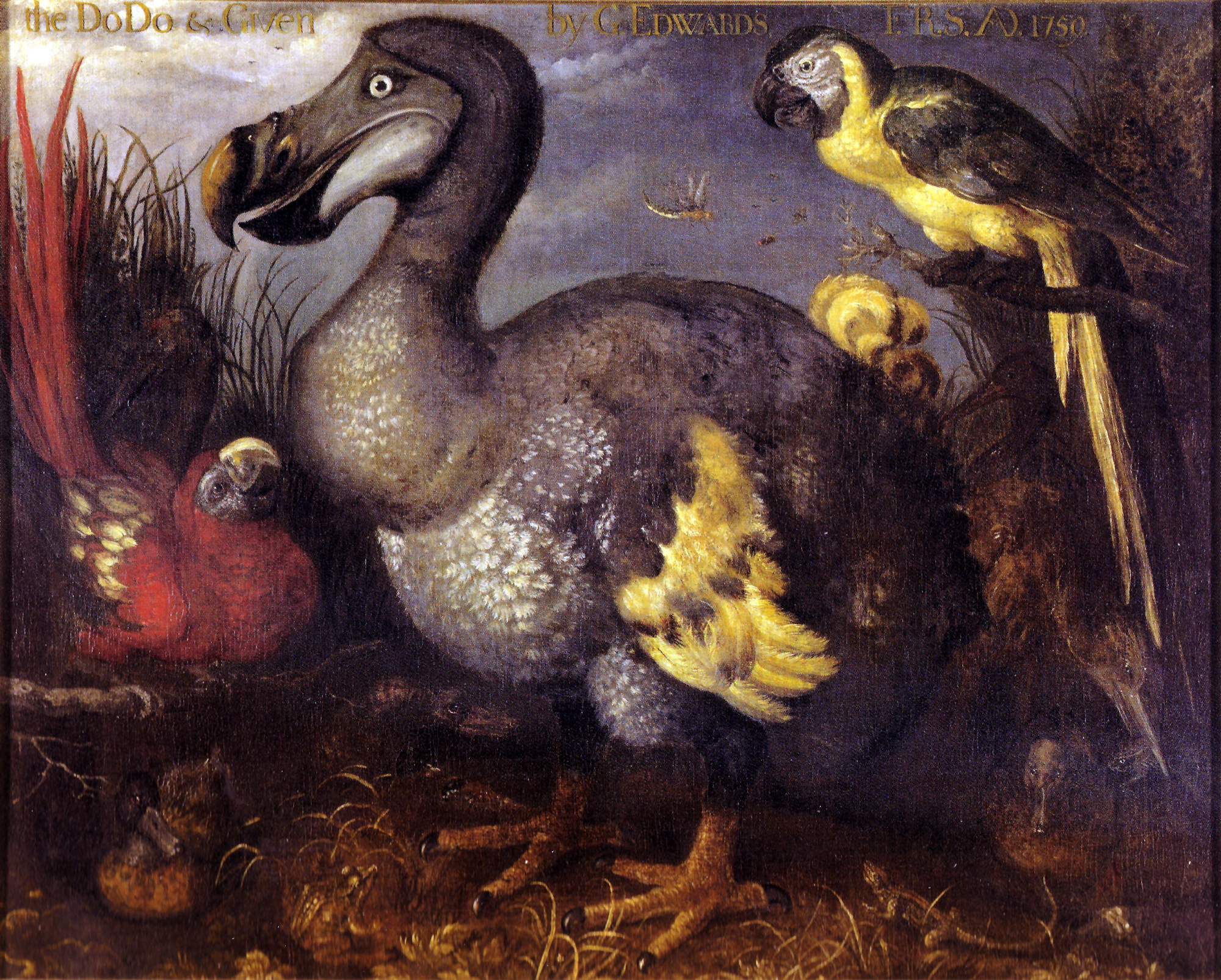
Edwards' Dodo, a 1626 painting by Roelant Savery, possibly showing this macaw on the right and a Lesser Antillean macaw on the left

The American ornithologist James Greenway used the emended spelling Ara martinica in 1958 and suggested that Bouton's description could have been based on a captive bird, noting that there were no other reports of similar macaws from the island. Yet he pointed out that Edwards' Dodo, a 1626 painting by the Dutch artist Roelant Savery, shows several birds including a blue and yellow macaw, which is different from the mainland bird in having yellow undertail covert feathers instead of blue, but the origin of this macaw is unknown. Another macaw in the painting may be the also extinct Lesser Antillean macaw (Ara guadeloupensis). In 1987, the American ornithologist Noel F. R. Snyder and his colleagues also thought the Martinique macaw probably represented mainland blue-and-yellow macaws, but speculated that a poorly known macaw that was never named may have lived on the island, based on the French pastor Charles de Rochefort descriptions of macaws of unknown provenance with plumage that does not match other species from the region (one pale yellow with a red tail and one red, white, blue, green, and black).

Rothschild's 1907 reassignment of Anodorhynchus martinicus to the genus Ara led to confusion as late as 2001, when the American ornithologists Matthew Williams and David Steadman assumed the two names referred to separate birds. The Martinique macaw has also been referred to by the common name orange-bellied macaw. The bird conservation organisation Birdlife International does not have an entry for the Martinique macaw, but it was mentioned in that of the Lesser Antillean macaw (which was itself considered Not Recognized). The International Union for Conservation of Nature considered the two possibly identical in their entry for the Lesser Antillean macaw.

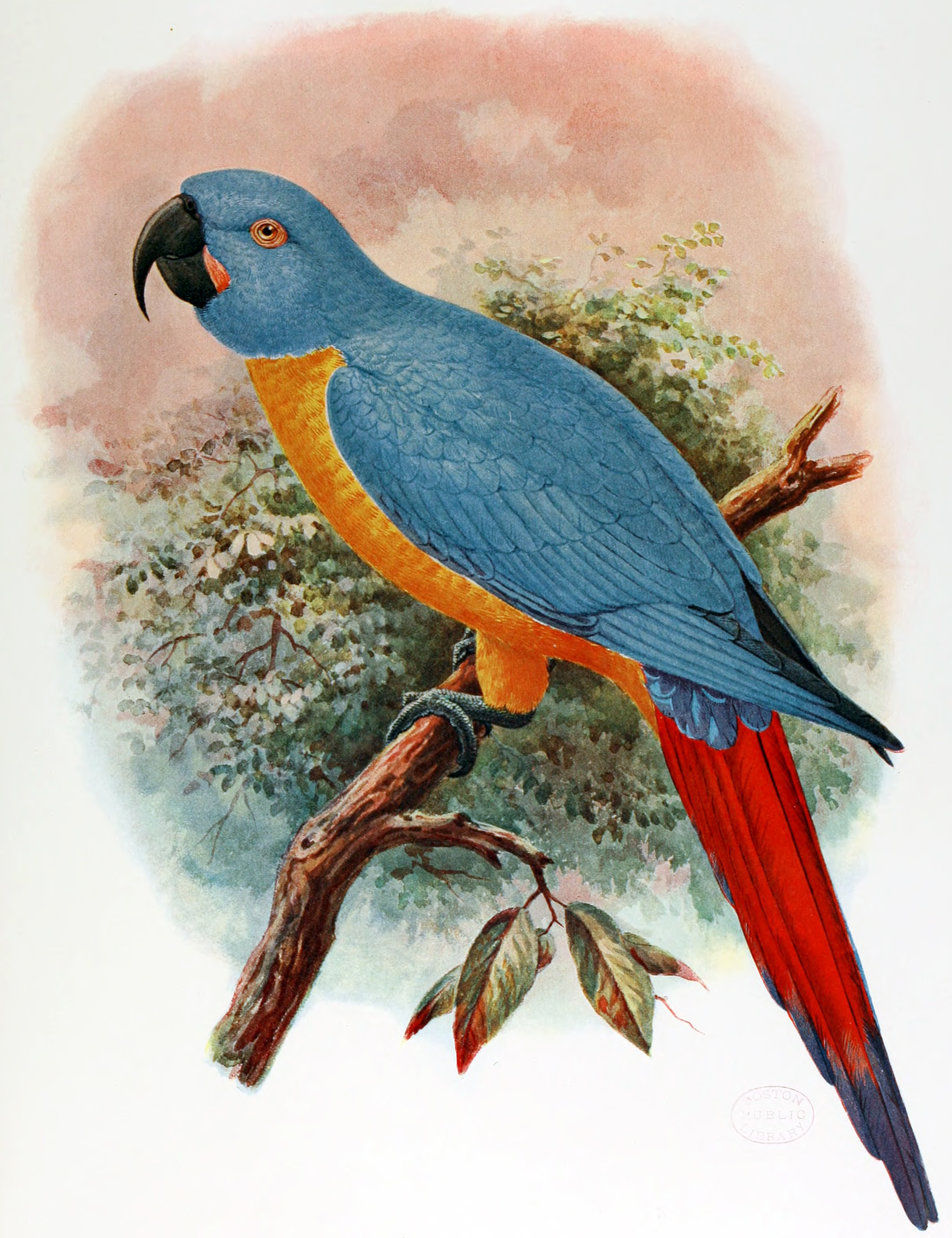
Keulemans' hypothetical 1907 reconstruction of Ara erythrura, a species possibly identical to the Martinique macaw

In the 1905 article that named the Martinique macaw, Rothschild also named an Anodorhynchus coeruleus, supposedly from Jamaica. The specific name coeruleus is Latin for "azure-blue". Salvadori also questioned this species in 1906, as he was unsure what Rothschild was referring to. In his 1907 Extinct Birds, Rothschild responded to Salvadori and clarified that his first description was erroneous, as he had misread an old description. He renamed the macaw Ara erythrura, based on a 1658 description by de Rochefort that described satiny blue and yellow parrots with red tails, and conceded that its provenance was unknown. He also included a Keulemans illustration of this parrot. Rothschild furthermore claimed that two large and supposedly blue and yellow macaws seen on Jamaica by a Reverend Comard in 1842 must have been this species. The specific name erythrura is Greek for "red-tailed". This species subsequently received common names such as red-tailed blue-and-yellow macaw and satin macaw.

Greenway suggested Rochefort's description was dubious, as he had never visited Jamaica, and appeared to have based his account on one by the French friar Jean-Baptiste Du Tertre. If anything, he considered the name a synonym of A. martinica. The British ornithologists Julian P. Hume and Michael Walters agreed in 2012 that if either bird ever existed, Ara erythrura is likely to have been identical to the Martinique macaw, and they found the contemporary accounts of both birds inadequate. The ornithologists James W. Wiley and Guy M. Kirwan suggested in 2013 that if any macaw species existed on Martinique, the name Ara martinica was most adequate to use, as no Anodorhynchus macaws occur anywhere near the West Indies, whereas Ara macaws occur on the adjacent South American mainland. Other similar blue and yellow macaws, such as the "great macaw" (Psittacus maximus cyanocroceus) were also reported from Jamaica.

=== Extinct Caribbean relatives ===
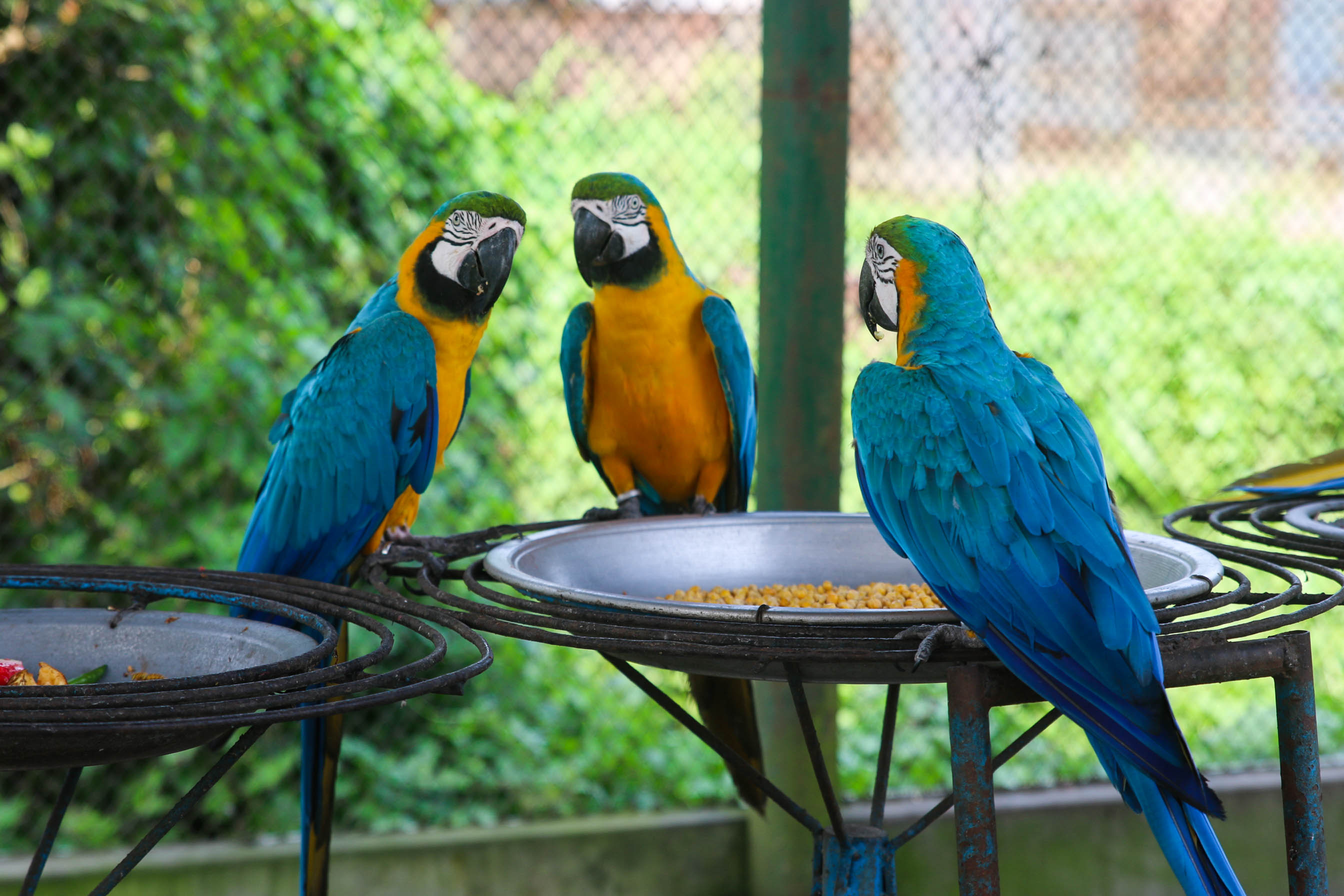
It has been suggested that the macaws observed on Martinique were actually blue-and-yellow macaws (here in captivity) that had been transported to the island.

Macaws are known to have been transported between the Caribbean islands and from mainland South America both in historic times by Europeans and natives, and prehistoric times by Palaeoamericans. Parrots were important in the culture of native Caribbeans, were traded between islands, and were among the gifts offered to the explorer Christopher Columbus when he reached the Bahamas in 1492. It is therefore difficult to determine whether the numerous historical records of macaws on these islands refer to distinct, endemic species, since they could have been based on escaped individuals or feral populations of foreign macaws of known species that had been transported there. As many as 13 extinct macaws have been suggested to have lived on the islands. Only three endemic Caribbean macaw species are known from physical remains; the Cuban macaw (Ara tricolor) is known from 19 museum skins and subfossils, the Saint Croix macaw (Ara autochthones) is only known from subfossils, and the Lesser Antillean macaw is known from subfossils and reports. No endemic Caribbean macaws remain today; they were likely driven to extinction by humans in historic and prehistoric times.

Specimen of the extinct Cuban macaw, the only Caribbean species of macaw known from skins

Many hypothetical extinct macaws were based only on contemporaneous accounts, but these species are considered dubious today. Several of them were named in the early 20th century by Rothschild, who had a tendency to name species based on little tangible evidence. Among others, the red-headed macaw (Ara erythrocephala) and the Jamaican red macaw (Ara gossei) were named for accounts of macaws on Jamaica, and the Dominican green-and-yellow macaw (Ara atwoodi) was supposedly from Dominica. The violet macaw (Anodorhynchus purpurascens), which was named for accounts of blue parrots supposedly from Guadeloupe, is now suggested to have been based on references to the Guadeloupe amazon (Amazona violacea).

Other species of macaw have also been mentioned, but many never received scientific names, or are considered synonyms of other species. Williams and Steadman defended the validity of most named Caribbean macaw species, and wrote that each Greater and Lesser Antillean island probably had its own endemic species. The ornithologists Storrs Olson and Edgar Maíz López doubted the validity of the hypothetical macaws in 2008, and that all Antillean islands once had endemic species, but wrote that the island of Hispaniola would be the most likely place for another macaw species to have existed because of the large land area, though no descriptions or remains of such are known. They wrote that such a species could have been driven to extinction before the arrival of Europeans. The identity and distribution of indigenous macaws in the Caribbean is only likely to be further resolved through palaeontological discoveries and examination of contemporary reports and artwork.

== Contemporary descriptions ==
Bouton's 1630s description of the Martinique macaw is reproduced below, translated from French:

The macaws are two or three times as large as the other parrots, [and] have a plumage much different in colour: those that I have seen have their plumage blue and orange-yellow (saffron). They also learn to talk and have a good body.

A translation of the 1658 French description of Ara erythrura by de Rochefort follows below:

Among them are some which have the head, the upper side of the neck, and the back of a satiny sky blue; the underside of the neck, the belly, and undersurface of the wings, yellow, and the tail entirely red.

In spite of the fact that the tail of Ara erythrura was described as entirely red, the plate in Rothschild's Extinct Birds showed a blue tip, which the American ornithologist Charles Wallace Richmond complained about in his review of the book.
