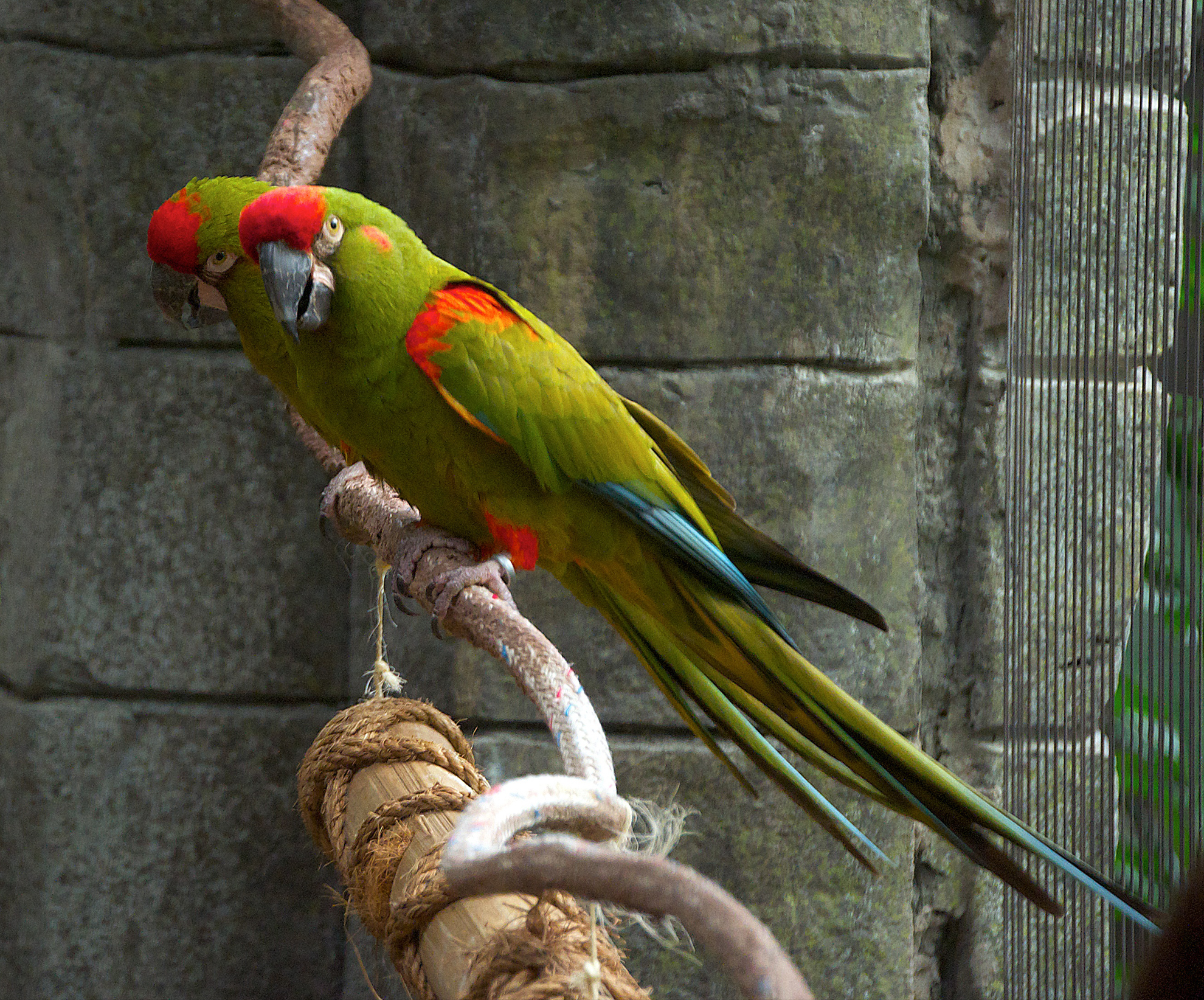
- At Tulsa Zoo, Oklahoma, US

Conservation status
- Critically Endangered (IUCN 3.1)
- CITES Appendix I

Scientific classification
- Kingdom: Animalia
- Phylum: Chordata
- Class: Aves
- Order: Psittaciformes
- Family: Psittacidae
- Genus: Ara
- Species: A. rubrogenys

Binomial name
- Ara rubrogenys Lafresnaye, 1847

= Red-fronted macaw =

Species of bird found in Bolivia

The red-fronted macaw (Ara rubrogenys) is a parrot endemic to a small semi-desert mountainous area of Bolivia. It is a critically endangered species; it has been successfully bred in captivity, and is available, if not common, as a pet. It is also sometimes known in the literature as Lafresnaye's macaw, named for the French ornithologist Frédéric de Lafresnaye, who was one of the first to describe the species.

== Description ==
The red-fronted macaw is 55–60 cm (21.5–23.5 in) long. It is mostly green, and has a red forehead, a red patch over the ears and bright red to orange edged under wing coverts. It has an area of pinkish skin around the eyes extending to the beak. It has red at the bend of wings and blue primary wing feathers.

== Range and habitat ==
The red-fronted macaw is native to a small mountainous area of south-central Bolivia situated about 200 km west of Santa Cruz, in the department of the same name, where the climate is medium altitude semi-desert. The natural vegetation consists mostly of cactus (large and small) and thorny trees and scrub. The climate is semi arid with cold nights and hot days. Rain comes in infrequent heavy storms. It is unusual in that it is the only macaw to inhabit such a climatic zone. Most macaws nest in holes in large trees, however here there are no very large trees in its range so it nests in vertical fissures in cliff faces. The bird has been captured for the pet trade in the past and killed by local farmers because it raids their crops.

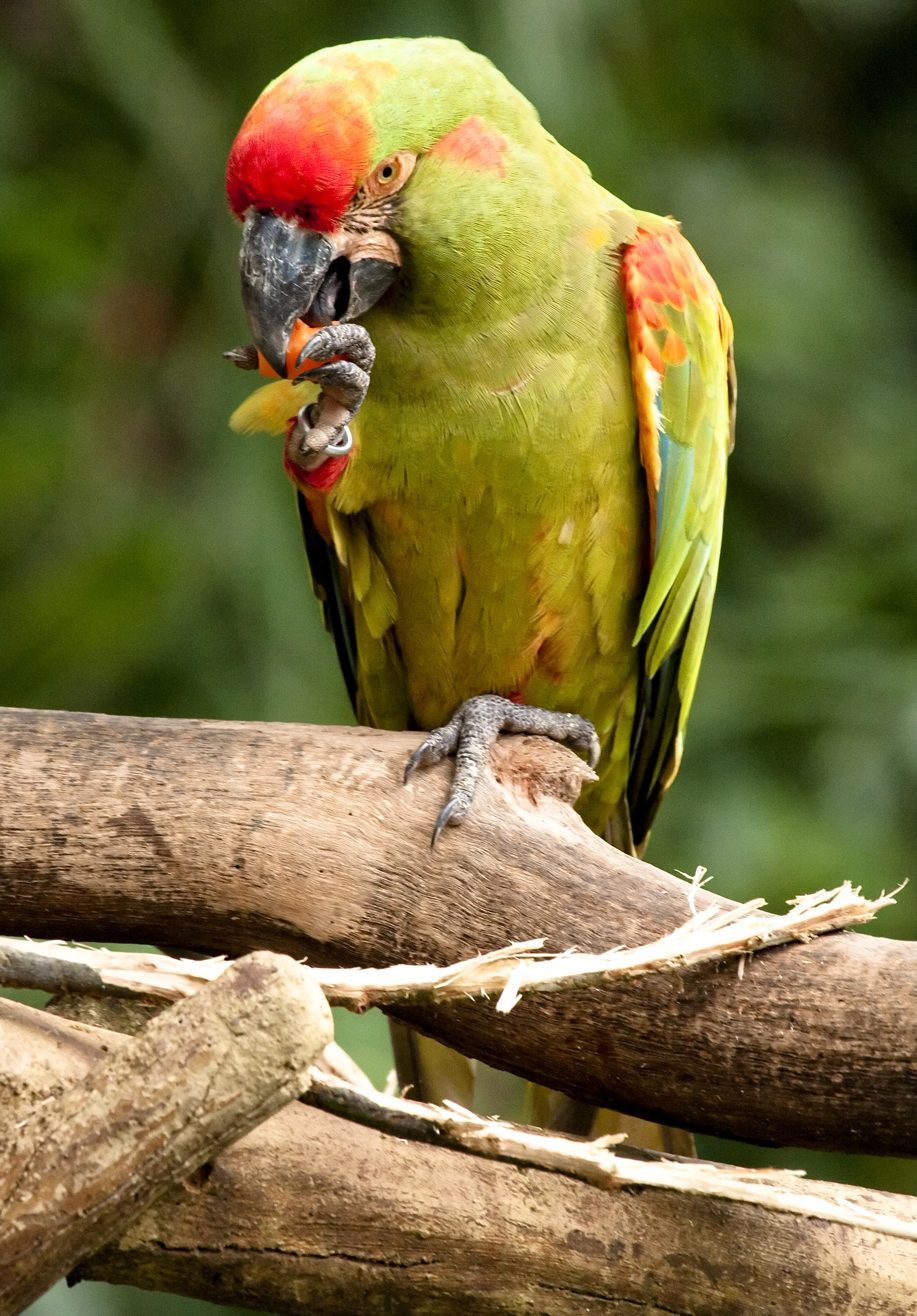
At Jurong Bird Park, Singapore

== Gallery ==
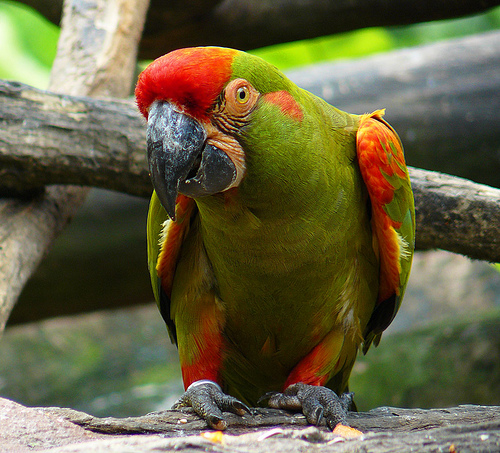
Upper body

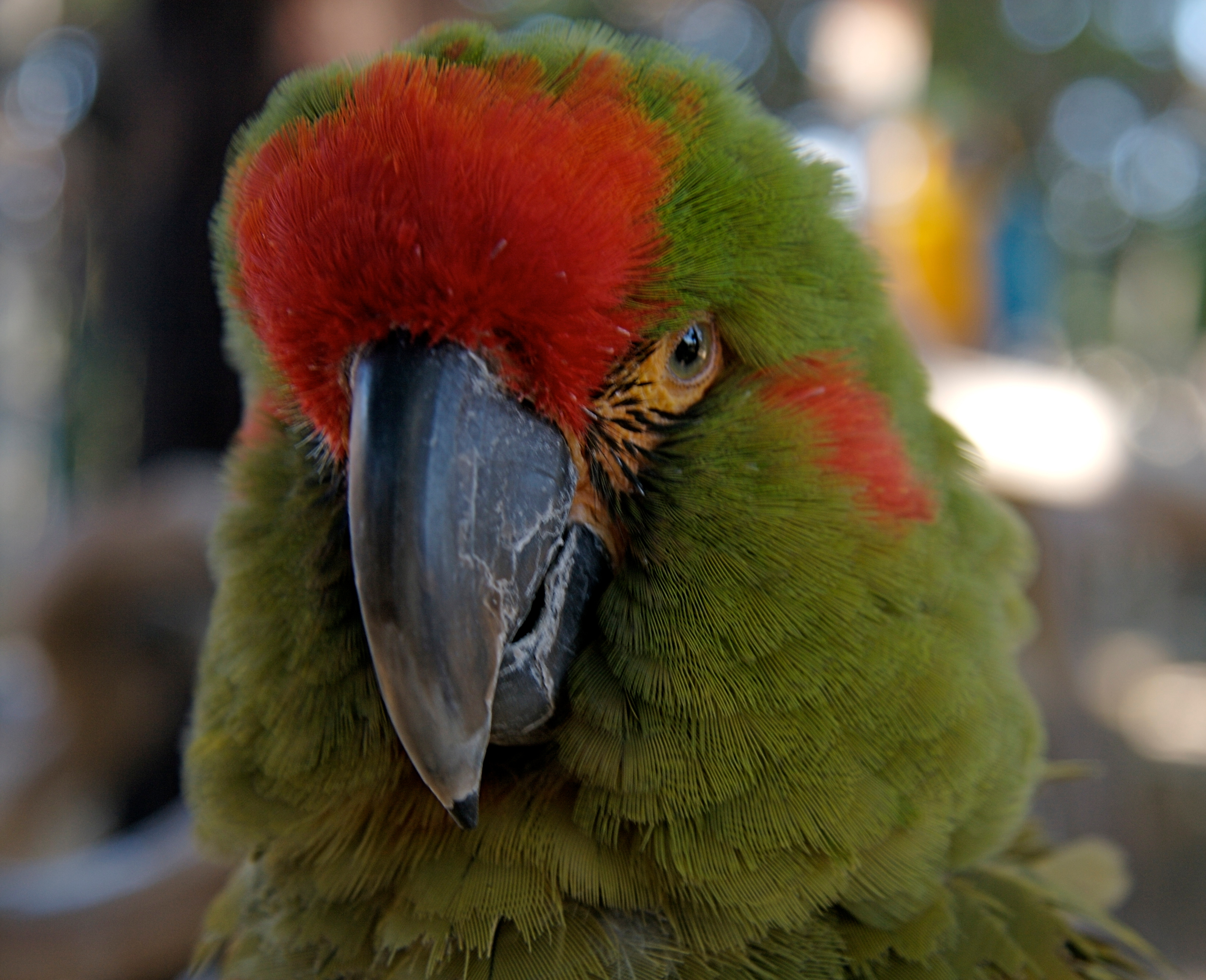
Head

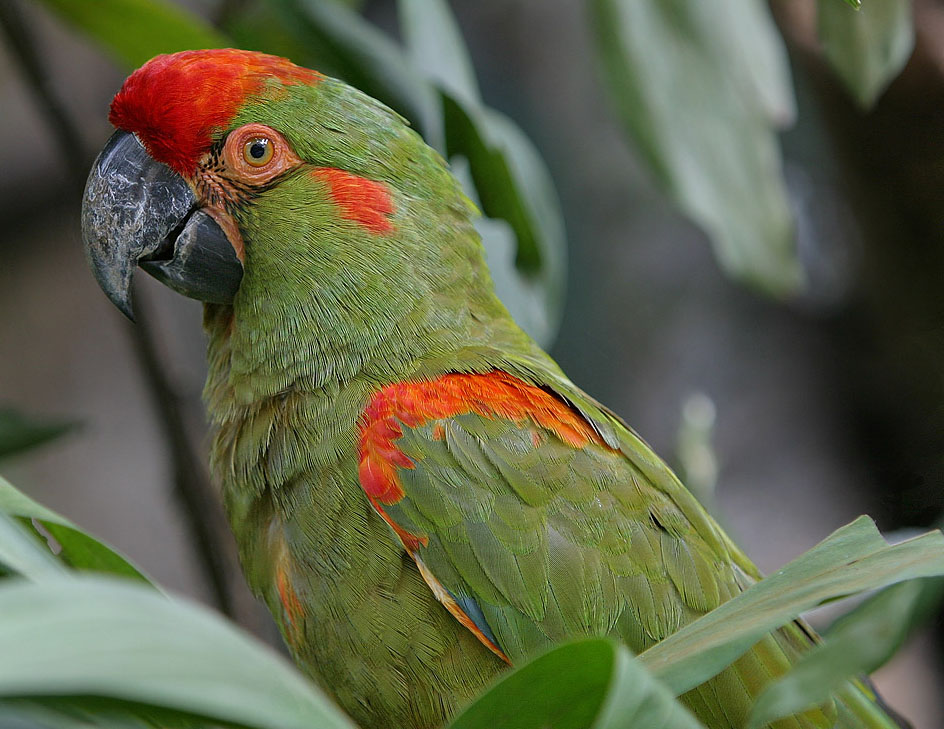
Side – Jurong BirdPark, Singapore

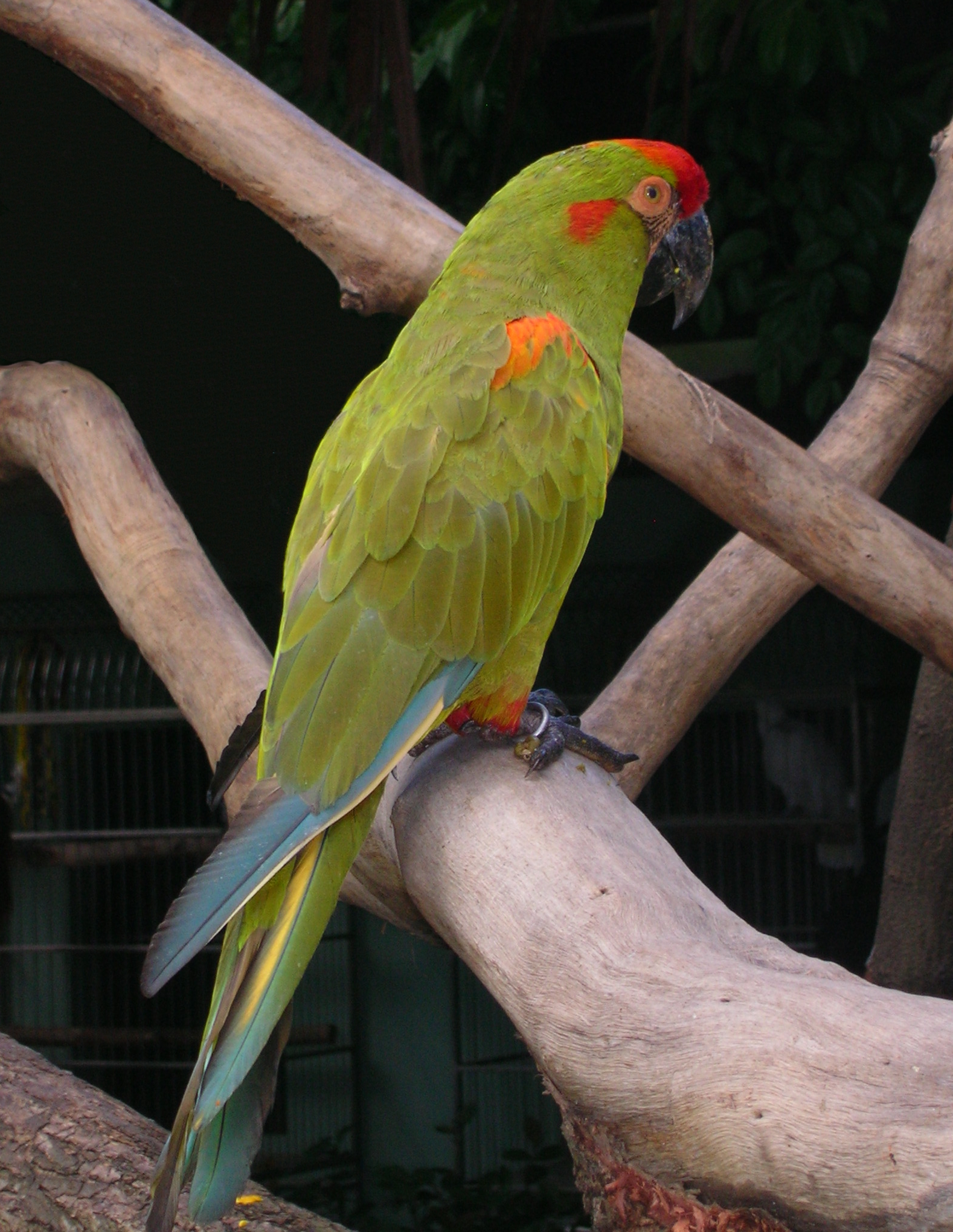
Wing clipped

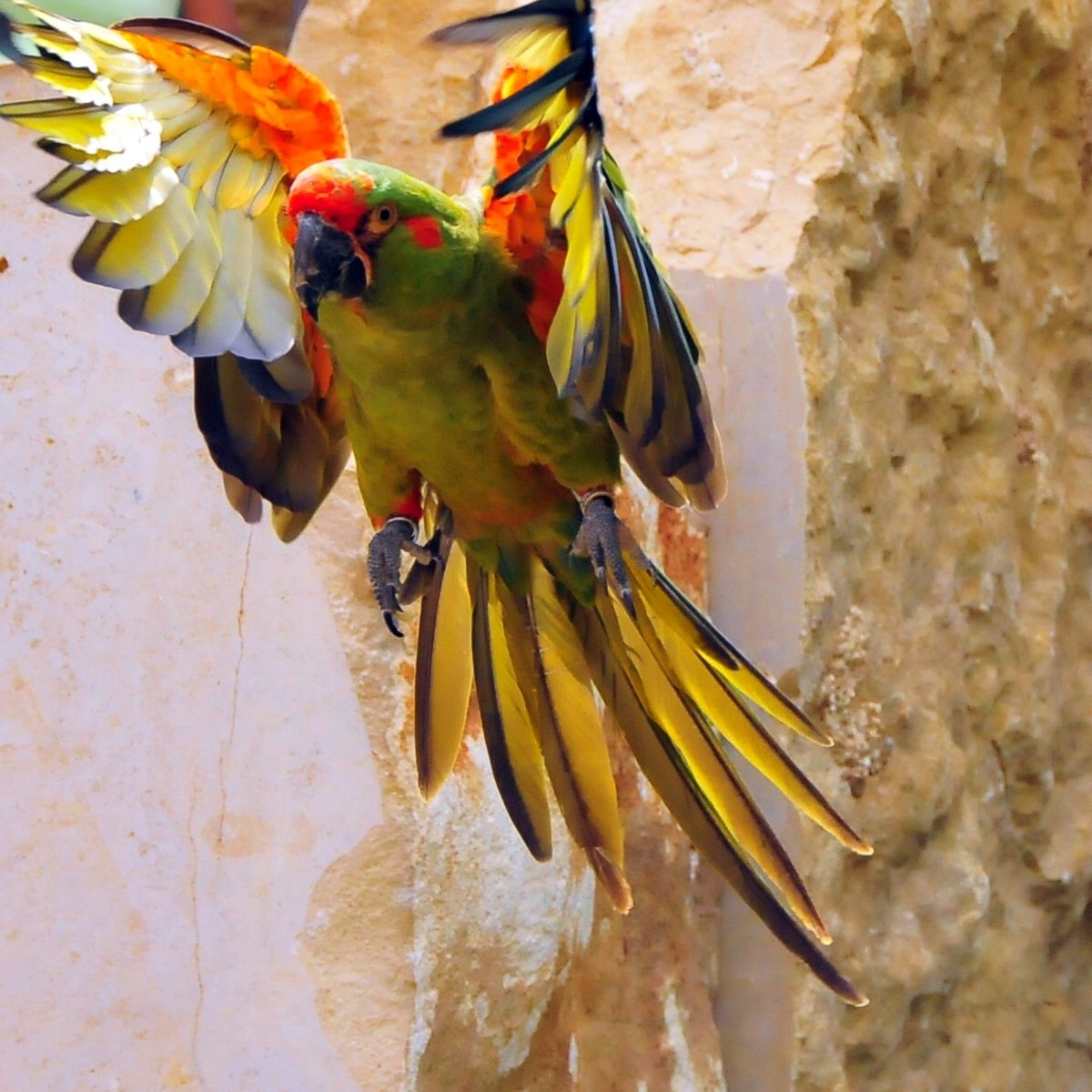
In the air

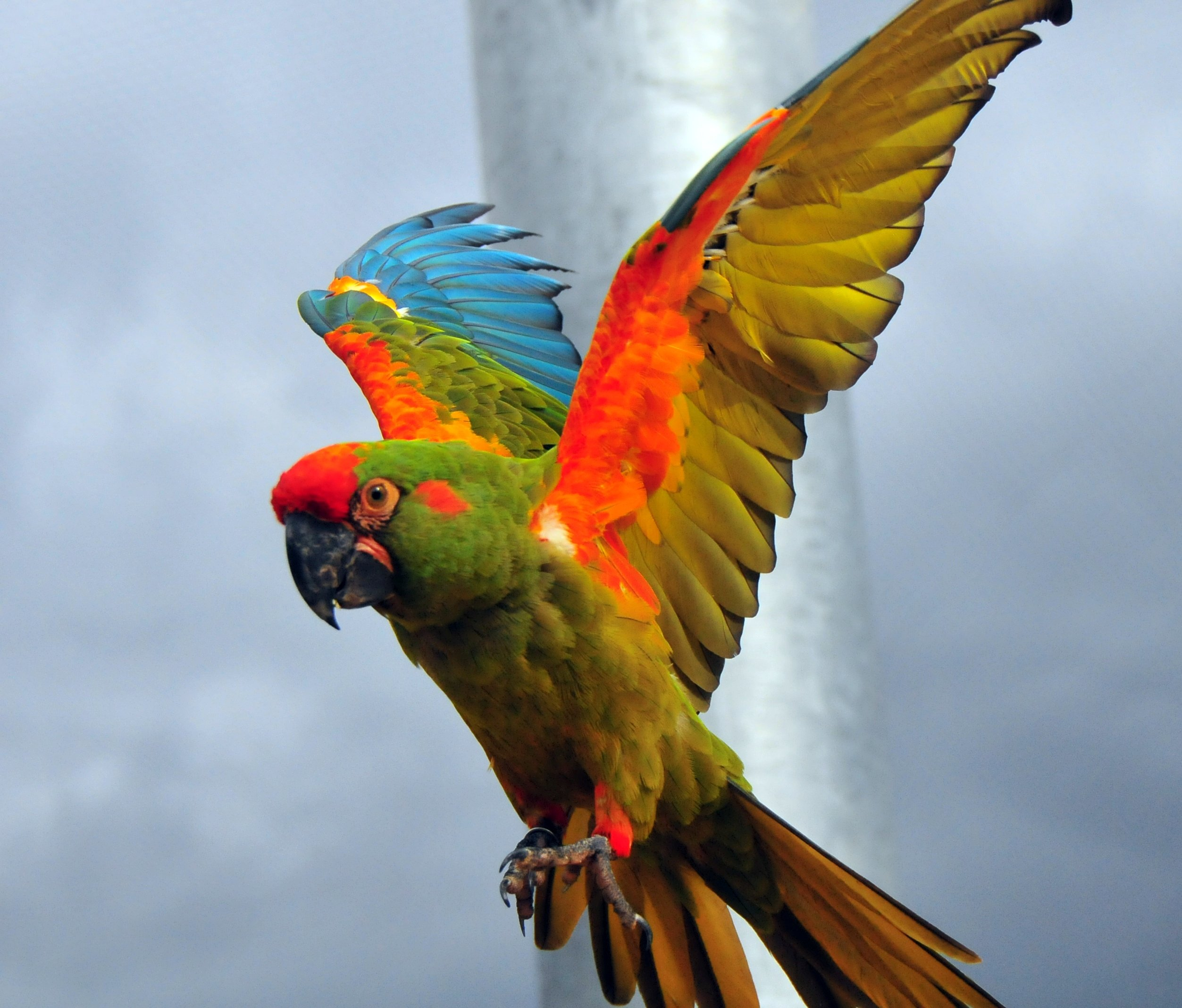
Flying
