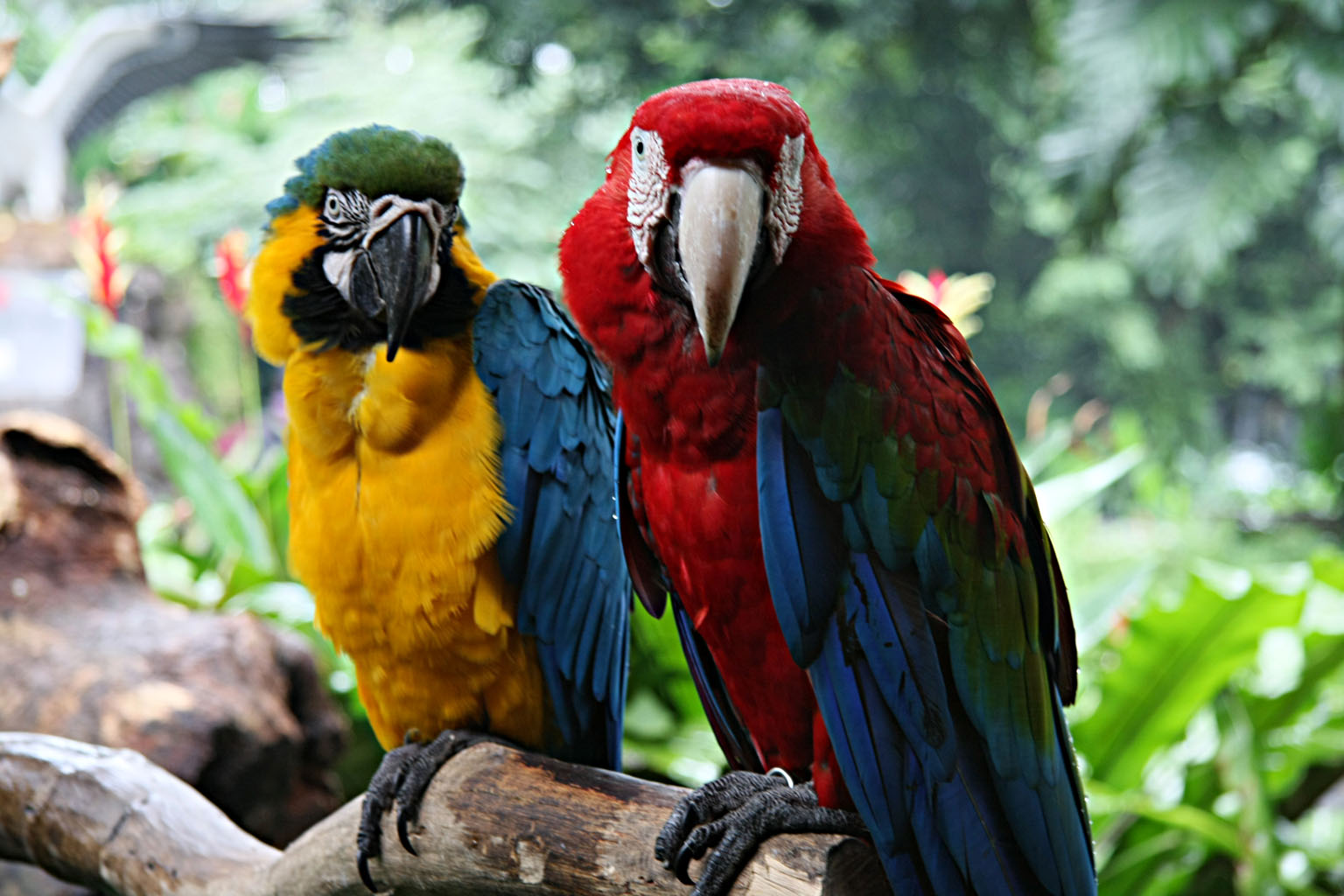
- Blue-and-yellow macaw (left) and green-winged macaw (right) at Jurong Bird Park, Singapore

Scientific classification
- Kingdom: Animalia
- Phylum: Chordata
- Class: Aves
- Order: Psittaciformes
- Family: Psittacidae
- Tribe: Arini
- Genus: Ara; Lacépède, 1799

Type species
- Psittacus macao (scarlet macaw) Linnaeus, 1758

Species
- See text

= Ara (bird) =

Neotropical genus of macaws

Ara is a Neotropical genus of macaws with eight extant species and at least two extinct species. The genus name was coined by French naturalist Bernard Germain de Lacépède in 1799. It gives its name to and is part of the Arini, or tribe of Neotropical parrots. The genus name Ara is derived from the Tupi word ará, an onomatopoeia of the sound a macaw makes.

The Ara macaws are large striking parrots with long tails, long narrow wings and vividly coloured plumage. They all have a characteristic bare face patch around the eyes. Males and females have similar plumage. Many of its members are popular in the pet trade, and bird smuggling is a threat to several species.

== Taxonomy ==
The genus Ara was erected by the French naturalist Bernard Germain de Lacépède in 1799. The type species was designated as the scarlet macaw (Ara macao) by Robert Ridgway in 1916. The genus name is from ará meaning "macaw" in the Tupi language of Brazil. The word is an onomatopoeia based on the sound of their call. For many years the genus contained additional species but it was split to create three additional genera: Orthopsittaca, Primolius, and Diopsittaca. Orthopsittaca and Diopsittaca are monotypic and are morphologically and behaviourally different, whereas the three Primolius macaws are green and smaller.

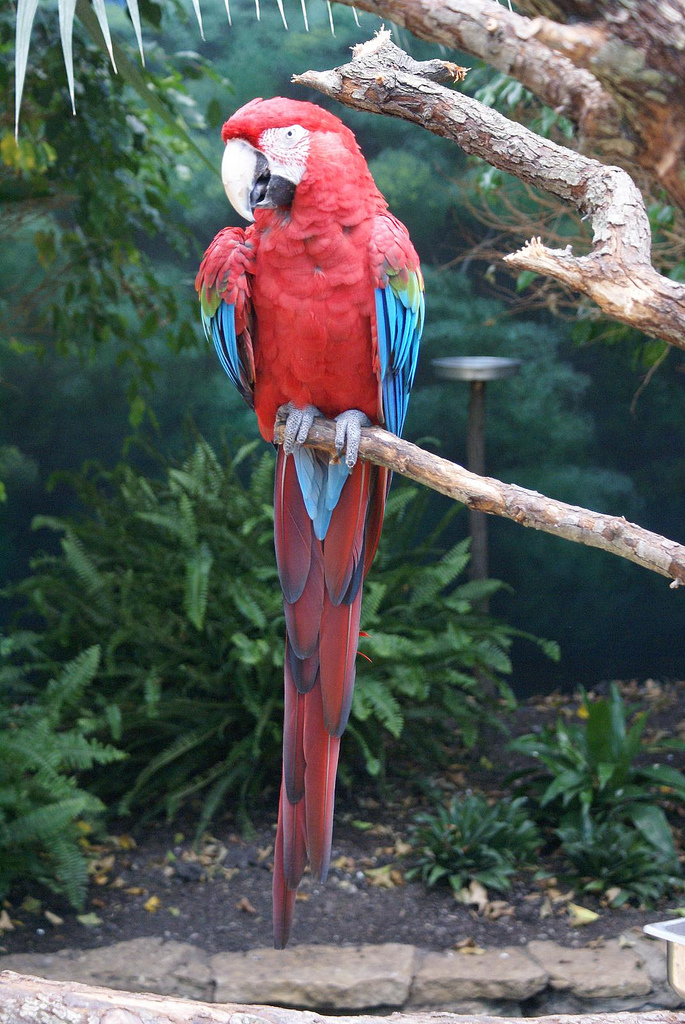
Green-winged macaw at Brookfield Zoo, US

There are eight surviving species, two extinct species that died out during modern times, and a third extinct species known only from subfossil remains. The last confirmed sighting of the extinct Cuban macaw was in 1864 when one was shot. Several skins of the Cuban macaw are preserved in museums, but none of its eggs have survived.

Several hypothetical extinct species of the genus Ara have been postulated based on very little evidence. They may have been distinct species, or familiar parrots that were imported onto an island and later presumed to have a separate identity.

== Morphology and appearance ==
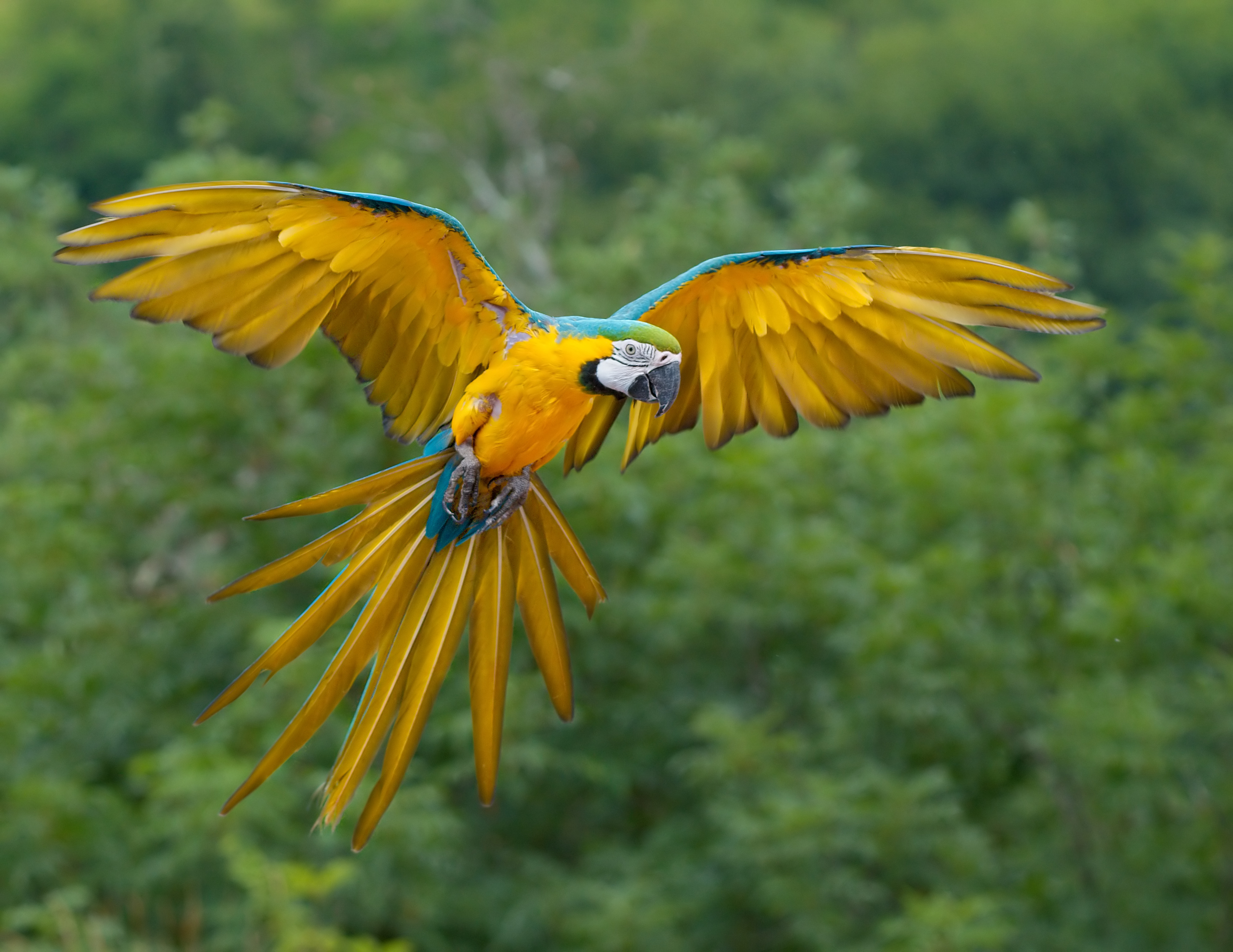
Like the rest of the genus, the wings of the blue-and-yellow macaw are long, as is the tail.

The Ara macaws are large parrots ranging from 46–51 cm (18–20 in) in length and 285 to 287 g (10 oz) in weight in the chestnut-fronted macaw, to 90–95 cm (35.5–37.5 in) and 1,708 g (60.2 oz) in the green-winged macaw. The wings of these macaws are long and narrow, which is typical for species of parrot which travel long distances in order to forage. They have a massive downward curved upper mandible and a patch of pale skin around the eye that extends to base of the beak. The skin patch bears minute feathers arranged in lines that form a pattern over the otherwise bare skin in all species of the genus except the scarlet macaw in which the skin is bare. In most species the bill is black, but the scarlet macaw and green-winged macaw have a predominantly horn coloured upper mandible and a black lower one.

The colours in the plumage of the Ara macaws are spectacular. Four species are predominantly green, two species are mostly blue and yellow, and three species (including the extinct Cuban macaw) are mostly red. There is no sexual dimorphism in the plumage, and the plumage of the juveniles is similar to adults, although slightly duller in some species.

== Distribution and habitat ==
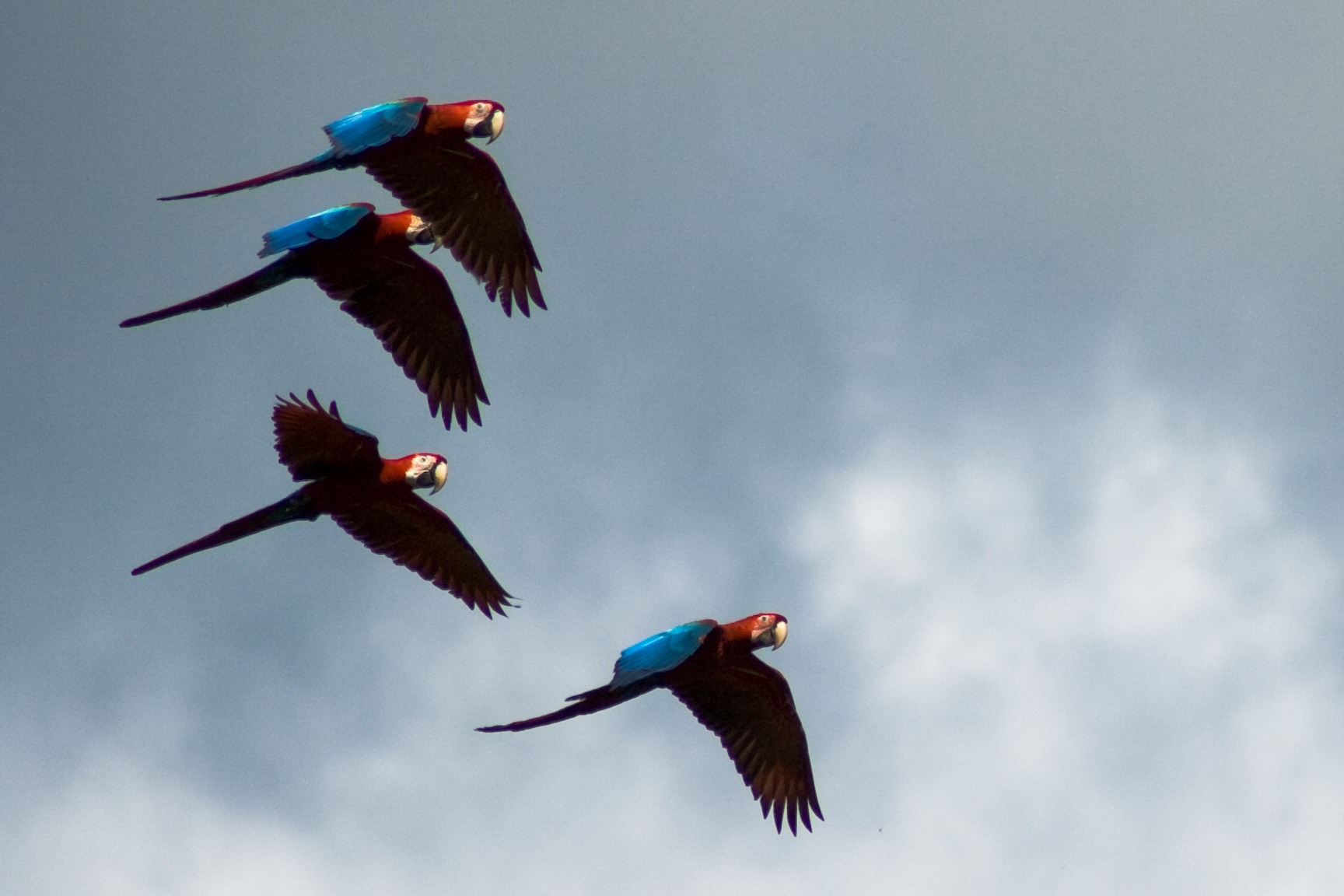
Four green-winged macaws flying in Peru

The Ara macaws have a Neotropical distribution from Mexico to Argentina. The centre of Ara distribution is the Amazon Basin and the Panama–Colombia border region; each with as many as four species found together (marginally five where the military macaw approach the western Amazon). Seven species are found in Bolivia, but no single locality in that (or any other) country surpasses four species. The most widespread species, the scarlet macaw, is (or was) distributed throughout large parts of Central America and the Amazon. On the other hand, the blue-throated macaw and the red-fronted macaw have tiny distributions in Bolivia. The overall range of many species and the genus as a whole has declined in historical times due to human activities. The military macaw is distributed from northern Mexico to northern Argentina, but the distribution is discontinuous, with populations in Mexico, a large gap, then a population in the Venezuelan Coastal Range and a population along the Andes from western Venezuela to northern Argentina. The blue-and-yellow macaw was extirpated from Trinidad in the 1960s (but was later reintroduced), and several hypothetical species apparently became extinct in the islands of the Caribbean.

The Ara macaws are generally fairly adaptable in their habitat requirements; this reaches its extreme in the scarlet macaw, which as suggested in its widespread distribution, uses most habitat types from humid rainforest to open woodlands to savannah. The only requirement is sufficient large trees, which is where they obtain their food and breeding holes. The other species are slightly more narrow in their habitat choices, but the need for large trees is universal. The blue-throated macaw generally inhabits forest "islands" in the savanna, and the red-fronted macaw prefers arid scrub and cactus woodland.

Within their range, birds may travel widely seasonally in search of food. They do not undertake large scale migrations, but instead more local movements amongst a range of different habitats.

== Feeding and diet ==
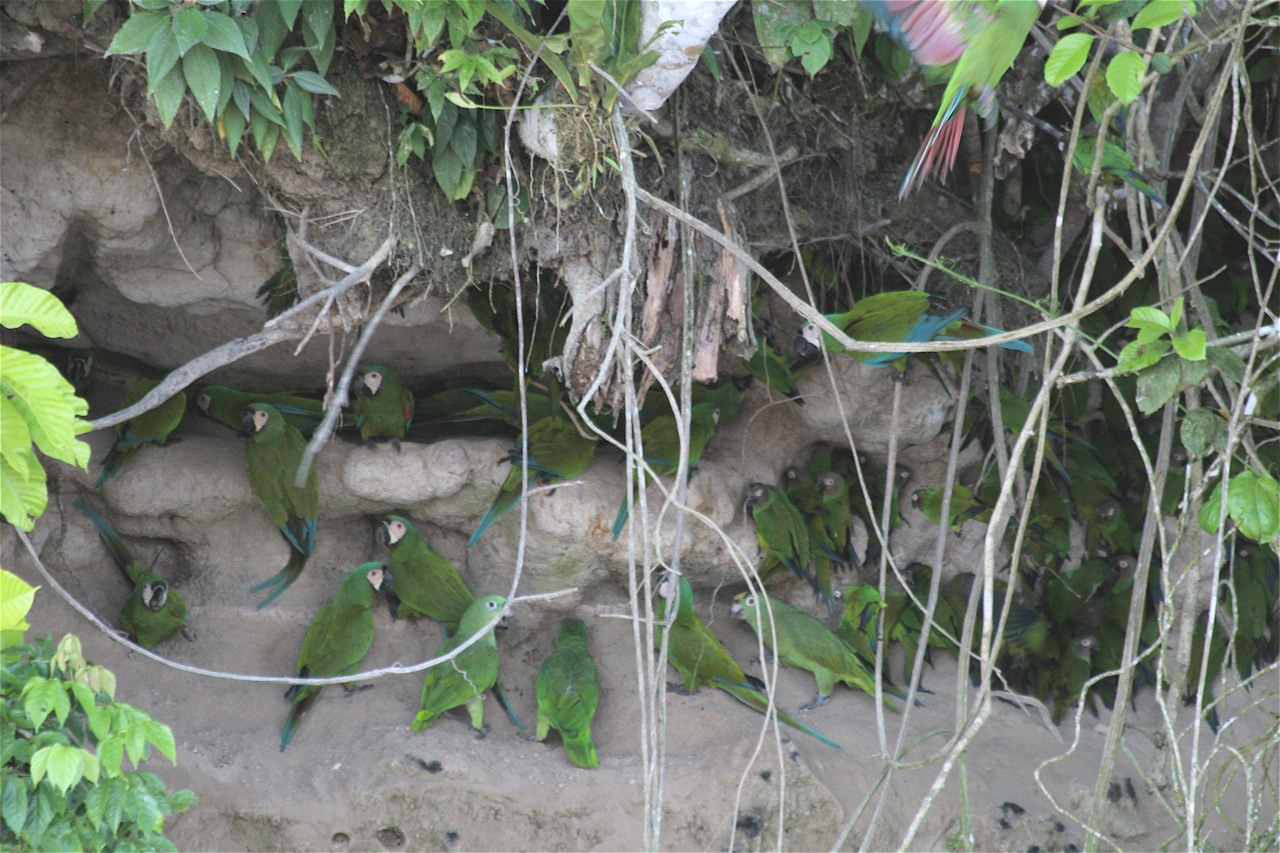
Chestnut-fronted macaws, mealy amazons, and dusky-headed parakeets at a clay lick in Ecuador

Like all macaws and most parrots, seeds and fruit are the major part of the diet of the genus Ara. The particular species and range of diet varies from species to species. Unlike many birds, macaws are seed predators not seed dispersers, and use their immensely strong beaks to open even the hardest shells. Their diet overlaps with that of some monkey species; in one study of green-winged macaws in Venezuela they shared many of the same trees as bearded sakis, although in some cases they ate the seeds at an earlier stage of ripeness than the sakis, when they contained more poison. Macaws, like other parrots, may consume clay to absorb toxic compounds produced by some poisons. As well, the toxic compounds of some foods may be neutralized by compounds, such as tannins, found in other foods consumed at the same time.

== Breeding ==
Like almost all parrots, the Ara macaws are cavity nesters. The majority of species nest in cavities in trees, either live or dead. Natural holes in trees may be used, particularly those in dead trees, otherwise holes created by other species; in Mexico military macaws still use the cavities excavated by the now critically endangered imperial woodpecker. In addition to nesting in trees, the military macaw and green-winged macaw will also nest in natural fissures in cliffs. This nesting habitat is the only one used by the red-fronted macaws, as large enough trees are absent in its arid range.

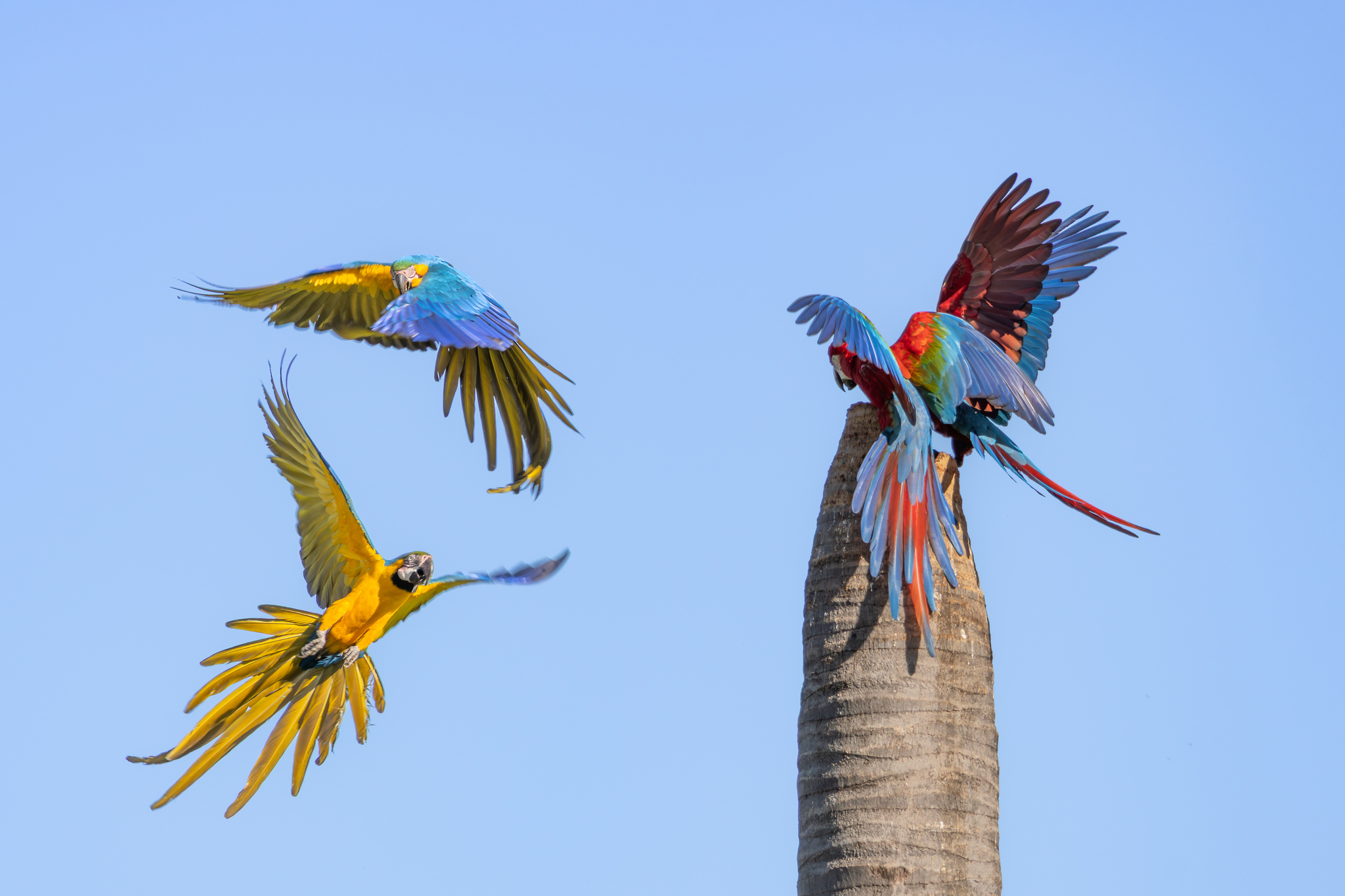
Two species of Ara, Ara ararauna and Ara chloropterus competing for space on a buriti tree in Minas Gerais, Brazil

== Species ==
Genus Ara – Lacépède, 1799 – ten species
Common name	Scientific name and subspecies	Range	Size and ecology	IUCN status and estimated population
Great green macaw or Buffon's macaw	Ara ambiguus (Bechstein, 1811) Two subspecies: Ara ambiguus ambiguus; Ara ambiguus guayaquilensis	Honduras to Panama, Colombia and Western Ecuador	Size: 85–90 cm (33–36 in) long. Mostly green, red on forehead, green and blue wings Habitat: Diet:	CR
Blue-and-yellow macaw or blue-and-gold macaw	Ara ararauna (Linnaeus, 1758)	Panama, Colombia through to south-central Brazil. Small introduced populations present in Puerto Rico and Miami-Dade County, Florida	Size: 80–90 cm (31.5–35.5 in) long. Mostly blue back and yellow front. Blue chin and green forehead. The upper zone of the bare white skin around each eye extending to the beak is patterned by lines of small dark feathers. Habitat: Diet:	LC
Green-winged macaw or red-and-green macaw	Ara chloropterus (Gray, GR, 1859)	South America, from Colombia through to northern Paraguay (formerly northern Argentina)	Size: 81–96 cm (32–36 in) long. Mostly bright red, with red, yellow and blue in the wings. There is bare white skin around the each eye extending to the bill Habitat: Diet:	LC
Blue-throated macaw	Ara glaucogularis Dabbene, 1921	North Bolivia	Size: 75–85 cm (30–34 in) long. Blue upperparts and mostly yellow lowerparts, blue throat. Areas of pale skin on the sides of the face are covered with lines of small dark-blue feathers, with pinkish bare skin at the base of the beak. Habitat: Diet:	CR
Scarlet macaw	Ara macao (Linnaeus, 1758) Two subspecies: Ara macao macao (Linnaeus, 1758); A. m. cyanopterus Wiedenfeld, 1995	eastern and southern Mexico and Panama through Guatemala, El Salvador, Honduras and Belize, the island of Coiba, to Colombia and the Amazon Basin.	Size: 81–96 cm (32–36 in) long. Mostly bright red, with red, yellow and blue in the wings. There is bare white skin around the each eye extending to the bill. Habitat: Diet:	LC
Military macaw	Ara militaris (Linnaeus, 1766) Three subspecies: A. m. mexicanus Ridgway, 1915; A. m. militaris (Linnaeus, 1766); A. m. bolivianus Reichenow, 1908	Mexico and along the Andes from Venezuela to north Argentina.	Size: 70 cm (28 in) long. Mostly green, red forehead Habitat: Diet:	VU
Red-fronted macaw	Ara rubrogenys Lafresnaye, 1847	Central Bolivia	Size: 55–60 cm (21.5–23.5 in) long. Mostly green. red forehead and red patch over the ears, pinkish skin on the face, red at bend of wings, blue primary wing feathers Habitat: Diet:	CR
Chestnut-fronted macaw or severe macaw	Ara severus (Linnaeus, 1758) Two subspecies: A. s. severus; A. s. castaneifrons	Panama and South America in the Chocó and Amazon Basin	Size: 46 cm (18 in) long. Mostly green, chestnut forehead, red at bend of wings Habitat: Diet:	LC
Cuban macaw or Cuban red macaw	† Ara tricolor (Bechstein, 1811)	formerly endemic on Cuba and probably also on Isla de la Juventud. It was possibly found in Jamaica and Hispaniola.	Size: 50 cm (20 in) long. Red forehead fading to orange and then to yellow at the nape of the neck, dark brown bill paler at the tip; orange face, chin, chest, abdomen and thighs; upper back mainly brownish red, and the rump and lower back blue; brown, red and purplish-blue wing feathers; upper surface of the tail was dark red fading to blue at the tip, and brownish red underneath. Habitat: Diet:	EX
St. Croix macaw	† Ara autocthones Wetmore, 1937	Saint Croix, U.S. Virgin Islands and central Puerto Rico	Size: Only known from sub-fossil bones found at two archeological sites. Habitat: Diet:	EX

== Hypothetical extinct Ara ==
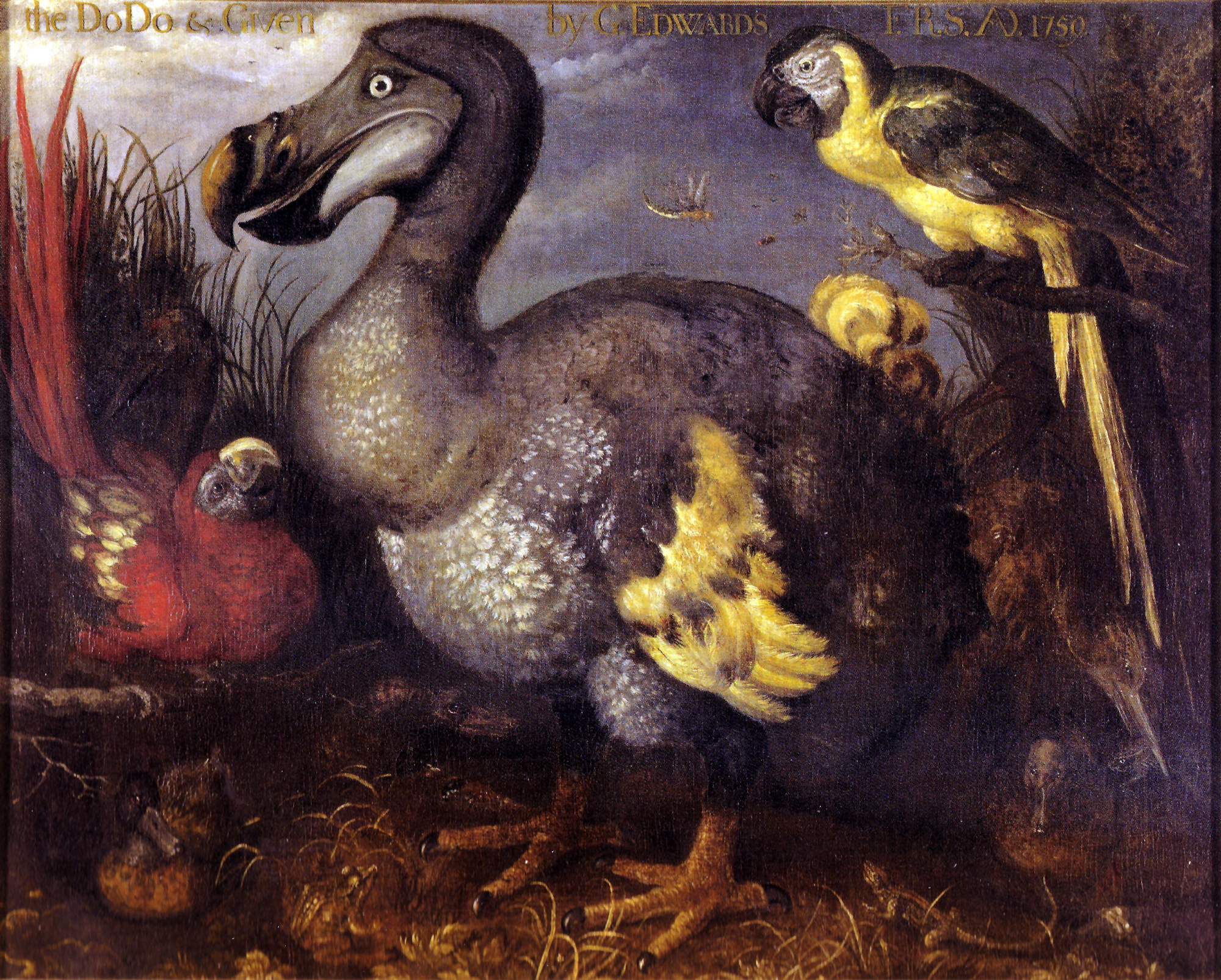
"Edwards' Dodo", a 1626 painting by Roelant Savery, possibly showing the Lesser Antillean macaw on the left, and Martinique macaw on the right

Macaws are known to have been transported between the Caribbean islands and from mainland South America both in historic times by Europeans and in prehistoric times by Paleoamericans. Parrots were important to the culture of native Caribbeans. The birds were traded between islands, and were among the gifts offered to Christopher Columbus when he reached the Bahamas in 1492. It is therefore difficult to determine whether or not the numerous historical records of macaws on these islands mention distinct, endemic species, since they could have been escaped individuals or feral populations of foreign macaws of known species that had been transported there. As many as thirteen extinct macaws have at times been suggested to have lived on the islands until recently. Only three endemic Caribbean Ara macaw species are known from physical remains; the Cuban macaw (Ara tricolor) is known from nineteen museum skins and subfossils, the Saint Croix macaw (Ara autochthones) is only known from subfossils, and the Lesser Antillean macaw (Ara guadeloupensis) is known from subfossils and reports. No endemic Caribbean macaws remain today, and they were likely all driven to extinction by humans, some in historic, and others in prehistoric times.

In addition to the three species known from remains, several hypothetical extinct Ara macaws were only based on contemporary accounts, but are considered dubious today. Many of these were named by Walter Rothschild in the early 20th century, who had a tendency to name species based on little tangible evidence. Among others, the red-headed macaw (Ara erythrocephala) and Jamaican red macaw (Ara gossei) were named for accounts of macaws on Jamaica, the Martinique macaw (Ara martinicus) was from Martinique, and the Dominican green-and-yellow macaw (Ara atwoodi) was supposed to come from Dominica.

Other species have been mentioned as well, but many never received binomials, or are considered junior synonyms of other species. Woods and Steadman defended the validity of most named Caribbean macaw species, and believed each Greater and Lesser Antillean island had their own endemic species. Olson and Maíz doubted the validity of all the hypothetical macaws, but suggested that the island of Hispaniola would be the most likely place for another macaw species to have existed, due to the large land area, though no descriptions or remains of such are known. They suggested such a species could have been driven to extinction prior to the arrival of Europeans. The identity and distribution of indigenous macaws in the Caribbean is only likely to be further resolved through palaeontological discoveries and examination of contemporary reports and artwork.

Hypothetical extinct species
Common and binomial names	Image	Description	Range
†Jamaican green-and-yellow macaw or red-headed green macaw (Ara erythrocephala); Extinct		Length unknown. Red head, bright green body, blue wings and blue greater coverts. Scarlet tail and blue on top, and the tail and wings were intense orange-yellow underneath.	Jamaica
†Jamaican red macaw or Gosse's macaw (Ara gossei); Extinct		Length unknown. Similar to the Cuban red macaw, but with a yellow forehead.	Jamaica
†Martinique macaw (Ara martinicus); Extinct		Length unknown. Blue with an orange-yellow chest.	Martinique
†Dominican green-and-yellow macaw (Ara atwoodi); Extinct		Length unknown. Green, yellow and red.	Dominica
†Lesser Antillean macaw or Guadeloupe macaw (Ara guadeloupensis); Extinct		Not known if it existed. Tail feathers 15–20 inches long. Similar colour as the scarlet macaw, but smaller with an entirely red tail. Known from descriptions and possibly paintings and subfossils.	Guadeloupe

== See also ==
- List of macaws
