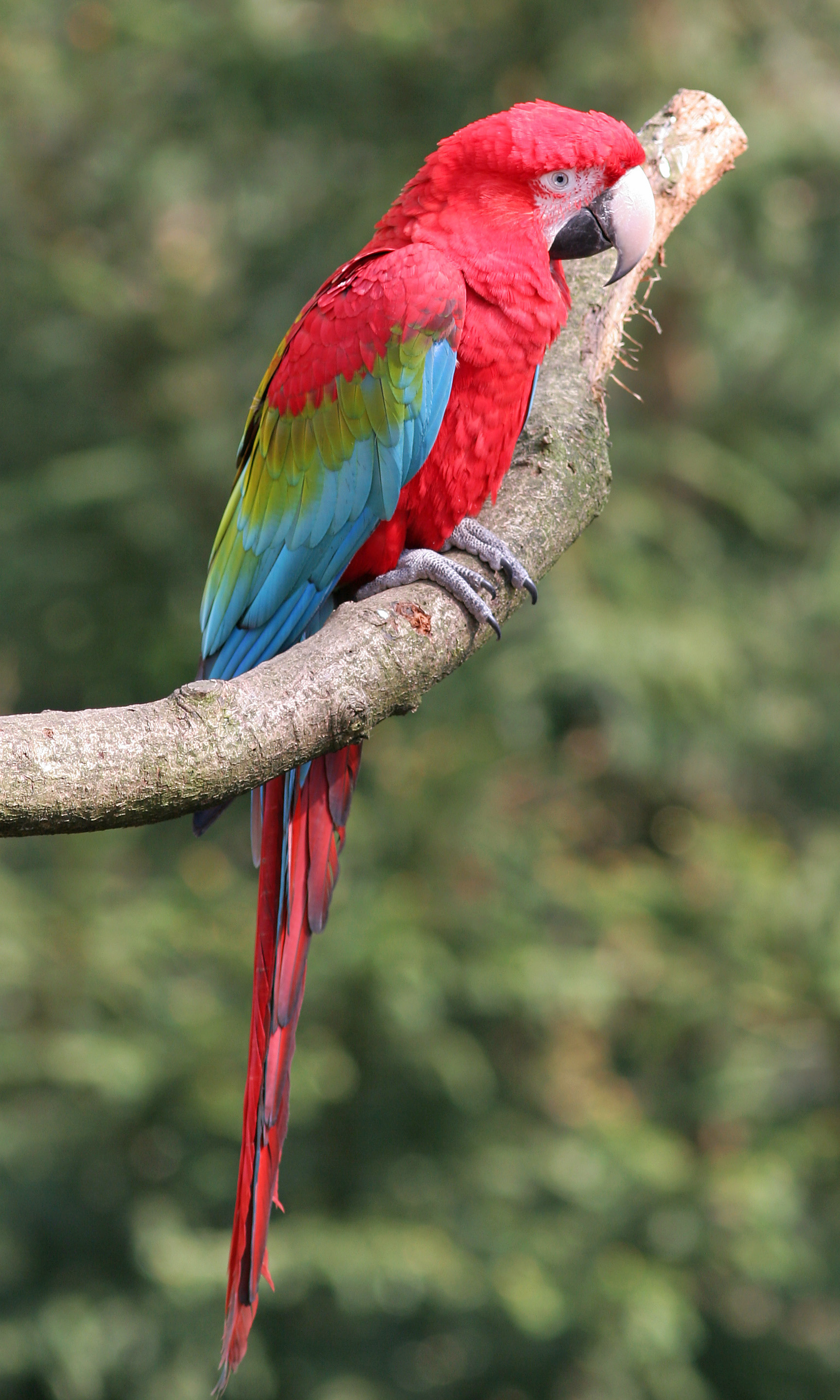
- At Apenheul Primate Park, Netherlands

Conservation status
- Least Concern (IUCN 3.1)
- CITES Appendix II

Scientific classification
- Kingdom: Animalia
- Phylum: Chordata
- Class: Aves
- Order: Psittaciformes
- Family: Psittacidae
- Genus: Ara
- Species: A. chloropterus

Binomial name
- Ara chloropterus Gray, GR, 1859
- Distribution of the green-winged macaw

= Red-and-green macaw =

Species of bird

The red-and-green macaw (Ara chloropterus), also known as the green-winged macaw, is a large, mostly-red macaw of the genus Ara. It is popular in aviculture, and is the second most commonly kept macaw species after the blue-and-yellow macaw. However, they are not as common in captivity as the blue-and-yellow, and are much more expensive; prices are often double that of the blue-and-gold.

This is the largest of the genus Ara, widespread in the forests and woodlands of northern and central South America. However, in common with other macaws, in recent years there has been a marked decline in its numbers due to habitat loss and illegal capture for the parrot trade.

== Description ==
The green-winged macaw can be readily distinguished from the scarlet macaw. While the breast of both birds are bright red, the upper-wing covert feathers of the green-winged macaw is mostly green (as opposed to mostly yellow, or a strong mix of yellow and green in the scarlet macaw). In addition, the green-winged macaw has characteristic red lines around the eyes formed by rows of tiny feathers on the otherwise bare white skin patch; this is one of the biggest differences from a scarlet macaw to the casual viewer. Iridescent teal feathers are surrounded by red on the tail. If seen together, the green-winged macaw is clearly larger than the scarlet macaw as well.

In terms of length, this species is second only in size to the hyacinth macaw, the largest of the macaws. The red-and-green macaw attains a total body length of 90 to 95 cm (35 to 37 in) in adults. Twelve adults were found to average 1,214 g (2.676 lb). A weight range of between 1,050 and 1,708 g (2.315 and 3.765 lb) has been reported. While its weight range is broadly similar to that of the hyacinth, the average weight of the red-and-green macaw is slightly surpassed by both the hyacinth and great green macaws, and amongst all living parrots additionally by the kākāpō.

== Behavior ==
The green-winged macaw generally mates for life. The female typically lays two or three eggs in a nest made in a hole in a tree. The female incubates the eggs for about 28 days, and the chicks fledge from the nest about 80-90 days after hatching.

== Population recovery ==
Since 1999 a population has appeared on Trinidad. Although these might have escaped from captivity, it is also possible they have a wild origin and represent an expansion of the species' range.

The historical range of this species is thought to have stretched southwards to include the Argentine provinces of Chaco, Corrientes, Formosa and Misiones. While feathers found in a Yschma tomb near Pachacamac from this species demonstrate cross-Andes trade ca. 1000–1470 CE. Hunting for meat, the pet trade and changes in land use are thought to have caused the species to be extirpated throughout its Argentine range by the 1960s. The species is listed as critically endangered in Argentina. In the mid-2010s birds were discovered to have colonised Iguazú National Park, and as of 2019 the species appears to have spread further into nearby Parque provincial Puerto Península.

The species is furthermore the subject of a re-introduction programme to Iberá Provincial Reserve in the province of Corrientes by the World Parrot Trust, Aves Argentinas and Fundación CLT (Conservation Land Trust) (and perhaps BirdLife International), which is hoped may promote tourism to the area. Captive birds from Britain were imported in 2015 and the first pair of British birds was released in February 2019. Its wild population is estimated to be currently between 50,000 and 499,999 individuals. It is listed on CITES Appendix II, trade restricted.

== Gallery ==
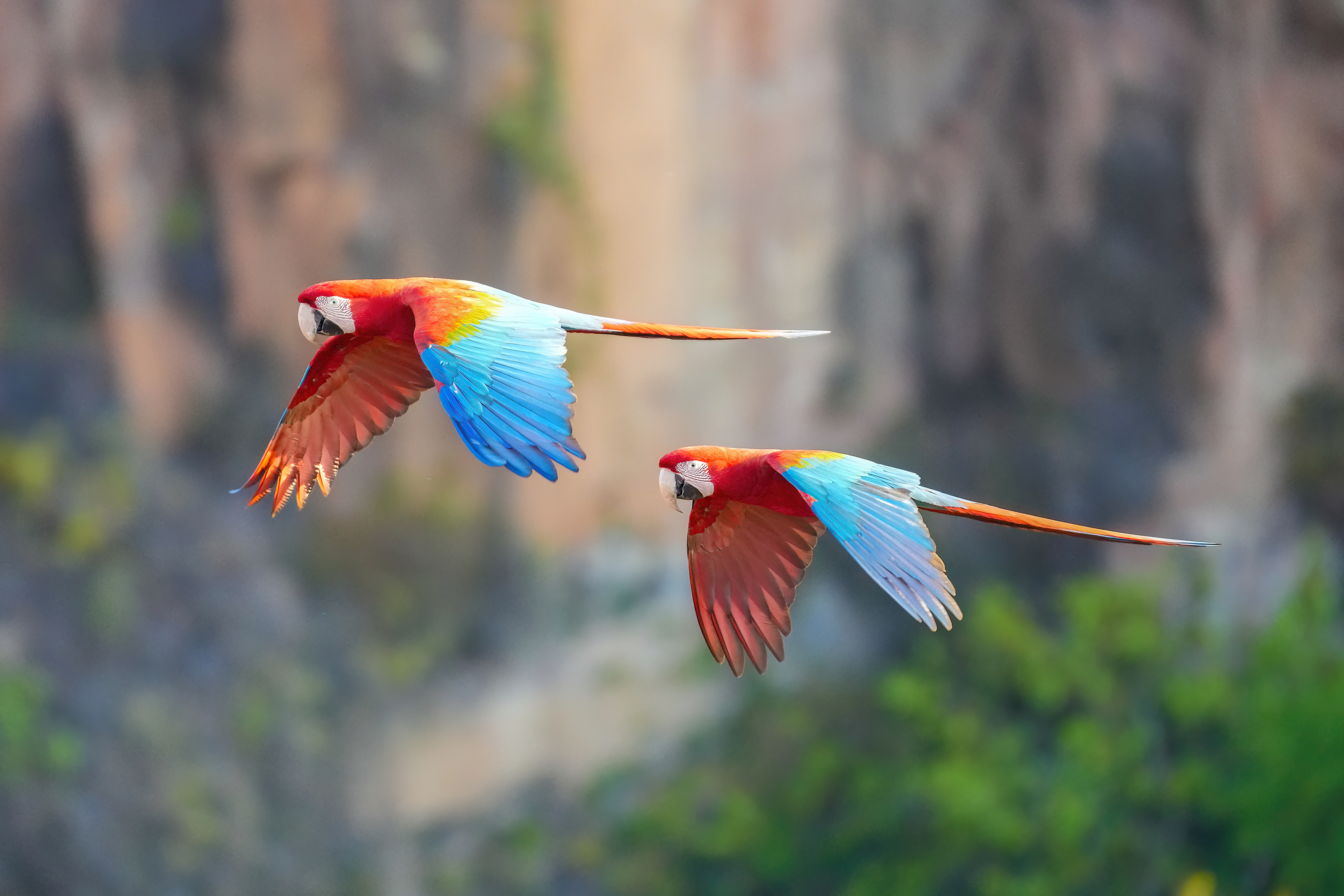
Couple in flight in Mato Grosso, Brazil

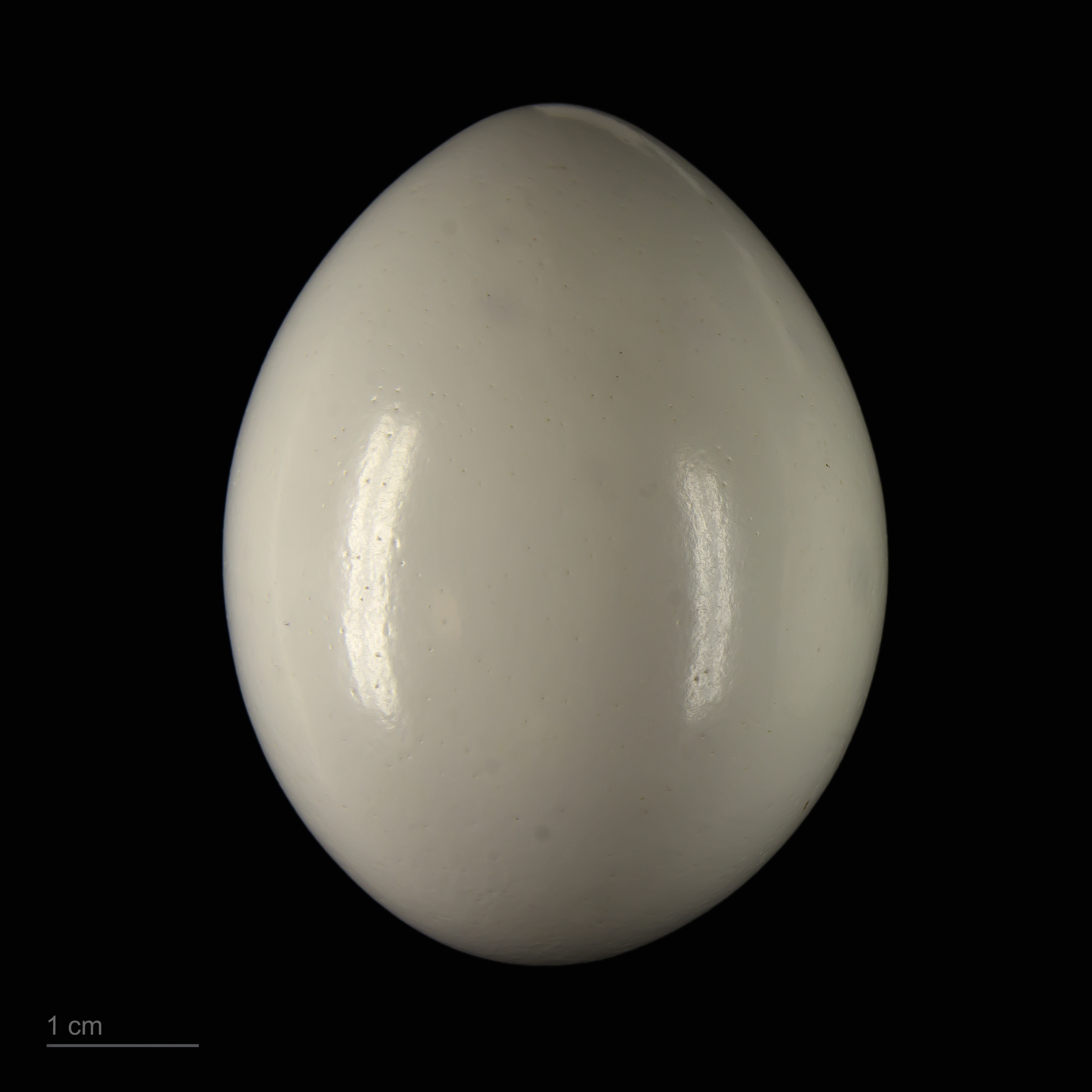
Ara chloropterus - MHNT

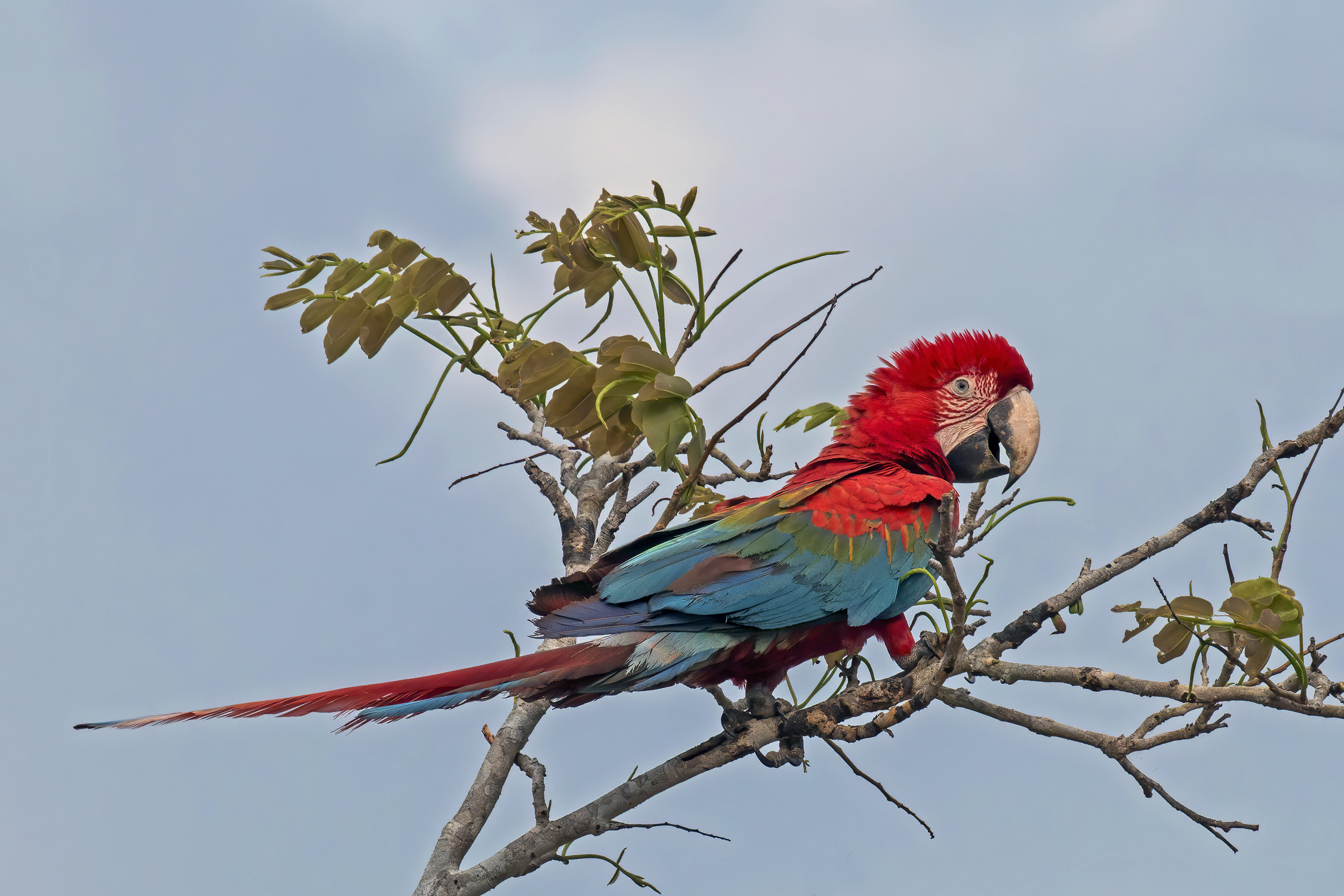
Juvenile, Pantanal, Brazil

Three wild green-winged macaws flying in Brazil

At Disney's Animal Kingdom

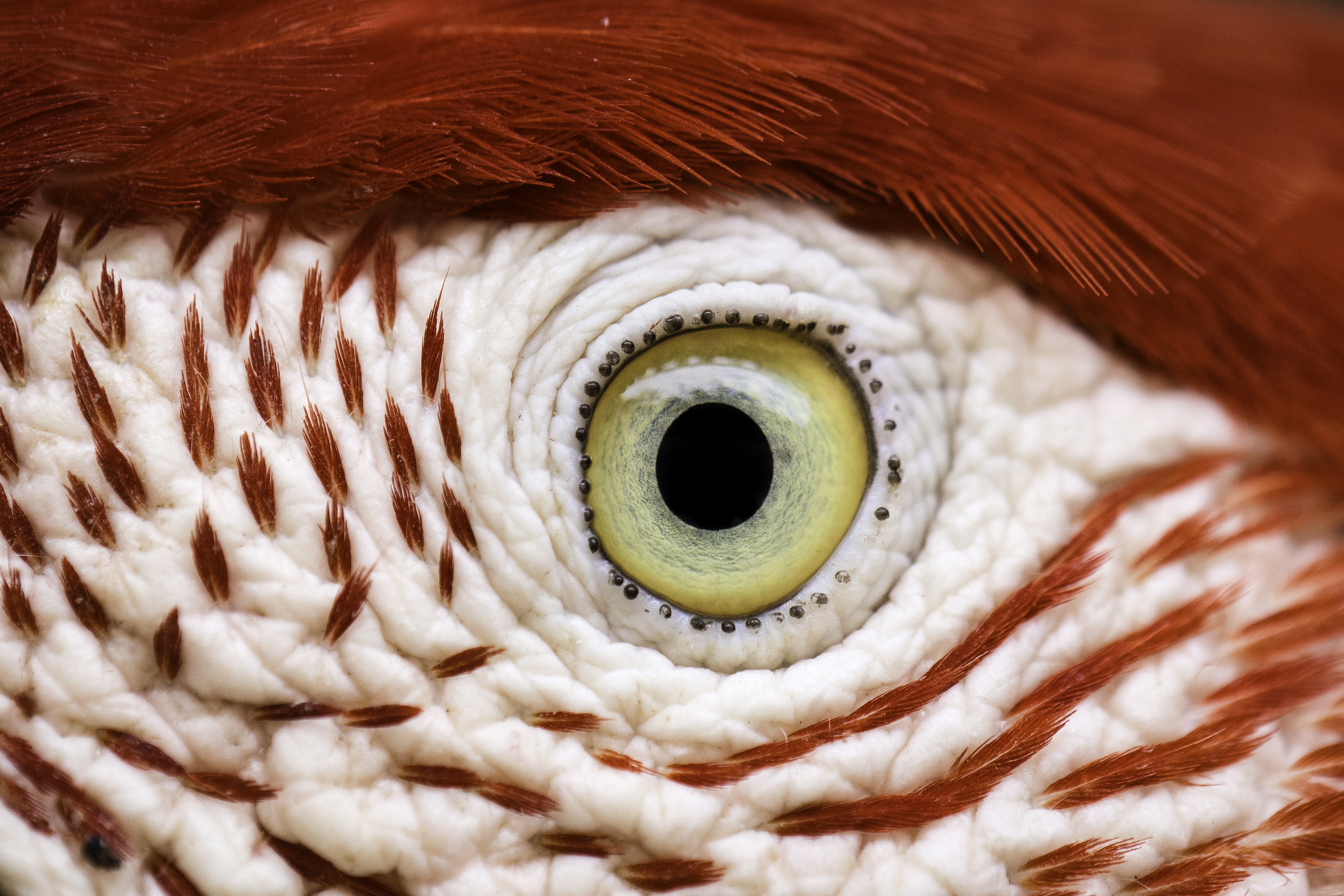
A macro shot of the eye, Serra da Capivara National Park, Brazil
