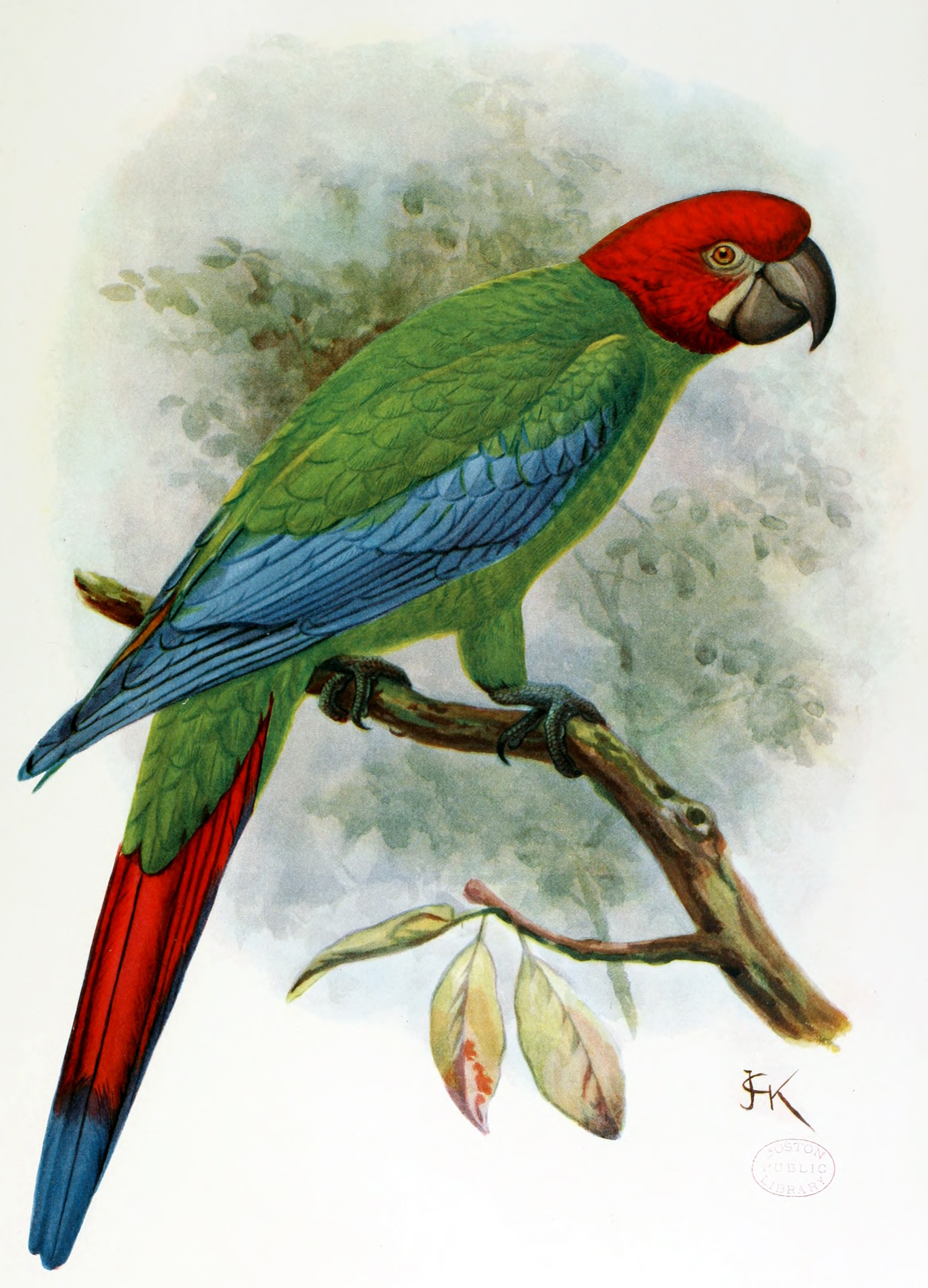
- Hypothetical illustration, John Gerrard Keulemans, 1907

Conservation status
- Not evaluated (IUCN 3.1)

Scientific classification (disputed)
- Kingdom: Animalia
- Phylum: Chordata
- Class: Aves
- Order: Psittaciformes
- Family: Psittacidae
- Genus: Ara
- Species: A. erythrocephala

Binomial name
- Ara erythrocephala Gosse, 1847
- Location of Jamaica

= Red-headed macaw =

Species of bird

The red-headed macaw or Jamaican green-and-yellow macaw (Ara erythrocephala) may have been a species of parrot in the family Psittacidae that lived in Jamaica, but its existence is hypothetical.

== Description ==
Rothschild based it on a description which a Mr. Hill had sent to Philip Henry Gosse:

Head red; neck, shoulders, and underparts of a light and lively green; the greater wing coverts and quills, blue; and the tail scarlet and blue on the upper surface, with the under plumage, both of wings and tail, a mass of intense orange yellow. The specimen here described was procured in the mountains of Trelawny and St. Anne's by Mr. White, proprietor of the Oxford estate.

Ara erythrocephala could have been found in the mountains of Trelawney and St. Anne's Parishes, Jamaica. It was described to have been found in the mountains, and presumably in forest as well.

== Extinction ==
It is believed that the main reason for the macaw's extinction was overhunting.

The macaw is extinct, and it is conjectured to have been hunted to extinction in the early 19th century. It was a close relative of the Cuban and Dominican macaws. Its existence is considered dubious today.
