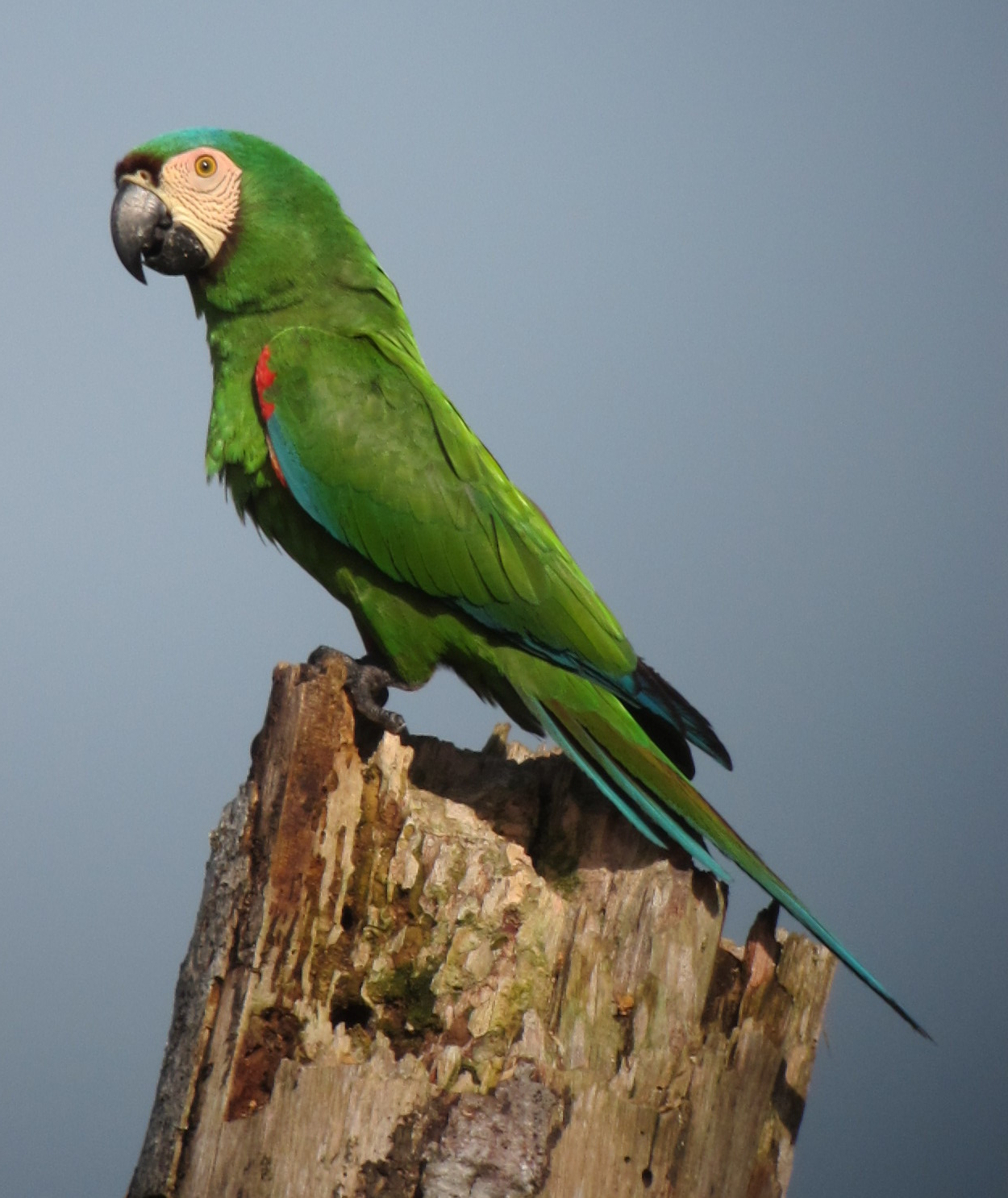

Conservation status
- Least Concern (IUCN 3.1)
- CITES Appendix II

Scientific classification
- Kingdom: Animalia
- Phylum: Chordata
- Class: Aves
- Order: Psittaciformes
- Family: Psittacidae
- Genus: Ara
- Species: A. severus

Binomial name
- Ara severus (Linnaeus, 1758)

Subspecies
- A. s. severus; A. s. castaneifrons

Synonyms
- Psittacus severus Linnaeus, 1758

= Chestnut-fronted macaw =

Species of bird

The chestnut-fronted macaw or severe macaw (Ara severus) is one of the largest of the mini-macaws. It reaches a size of around 45 cm (18 in) of which around half is the length of the tail.

They can be found over a large part of Northern South America from Panama south into Amazonian Brazil and central Bolivia. A feral population is found in Florida.

Their lifespan is listed as anything from 30 to 80 years of age.

== Taxonomy ==
The chestnut-fronted macaw was formally described in 1758 by the Swedish naturalist Carl Linnaeus in the tenth edition of his Systema Naturae. He placed it with all the other parrots in the genus Psittacus and coined the binomial name Psittacus severus. This macaw is now one of the eight extant species placed the genus Ara that was erected in 1799 by the French naturalist Bernard Germain de Lacépède. The genus name is from ará meaning "macaw" in the Tupi language of Brazil. The word is an onomatopoeia based on the sound of their call. The specific epithet severus is Latin meaning "grim", "cruel" or "stern". The species is considered to be monotypic: no subspecies are recognised.

== Description ==
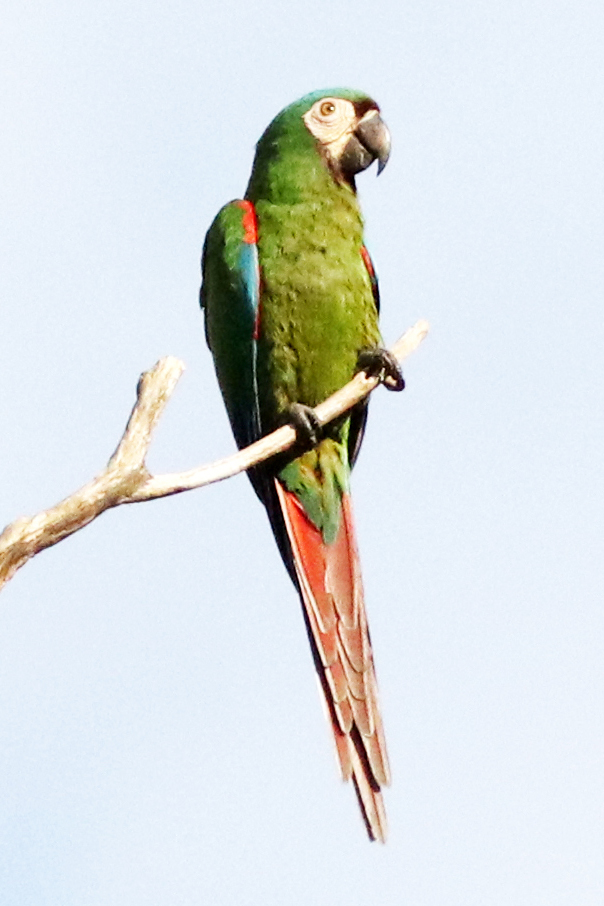
In northeastern Ecuador showing red on underside of tail

The chestnut-fronted or severe macaw is mostly green in colour with patches of red and blue on the wings. The head has a chestnut brown patch just above the beak. The beak is black and the patches around the eyes are white with lines of small black feathers. It is the only one of the miniature macaws that has lines of feathers in the bare patches around its eyes. In the wild their typically gregarious personality can become more aggressive at puberty, giving them the name "severe macaw". This tendency can be curbed in captivity but the species requires significant handling to make a tame pet. It is 45–50 cm (17.5–19.5 in) long and weighs 300–410 g (11–14 oz).

== Breeding ==
The chestnut-fronted macaw nests in a hole in a tree. Each clutch usually has two or three white eggs. The female incubates the eggs for about 28 days, and the chicks fledge from the nest about 70 days after hatching.

== Gallery ==
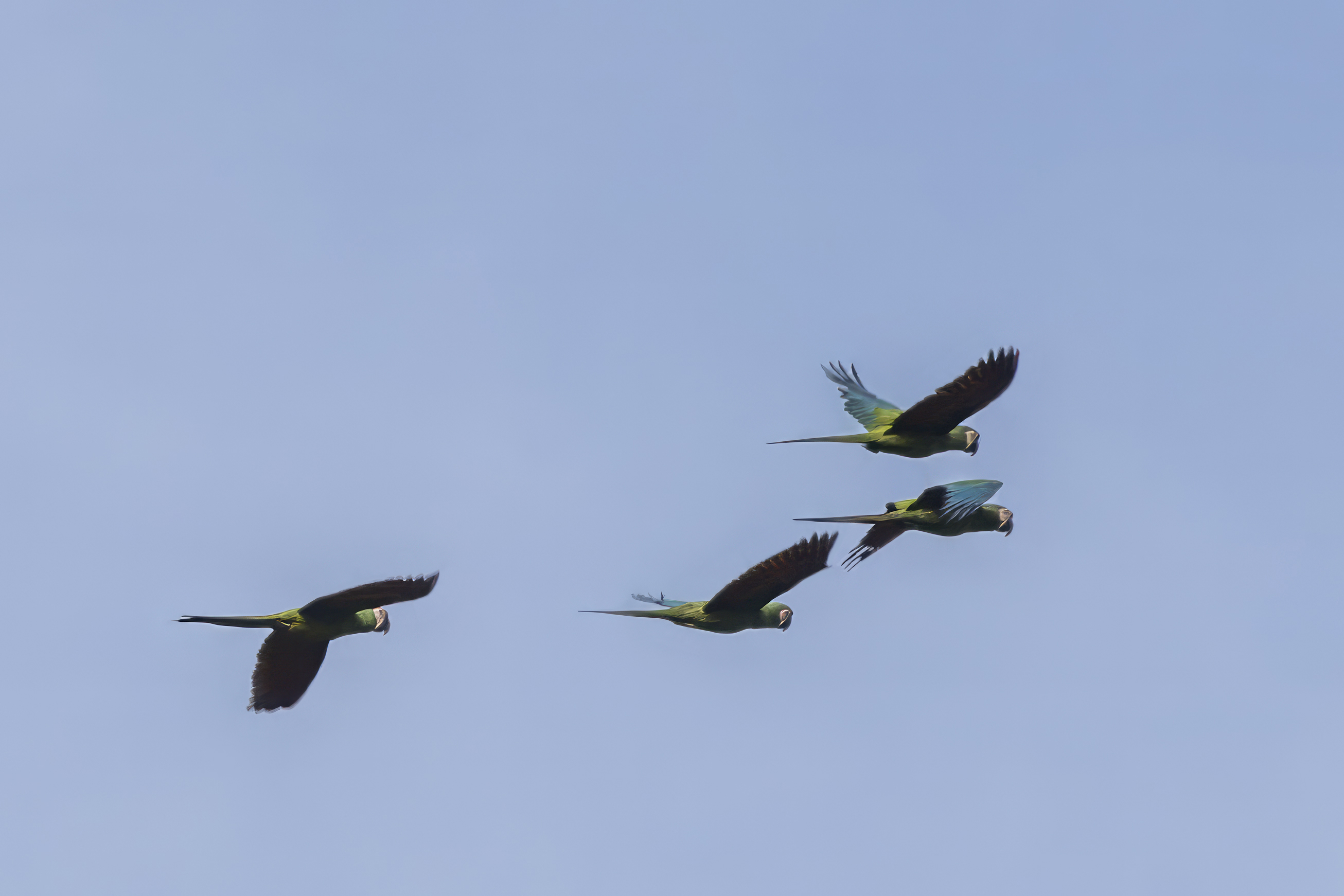
In Colombia

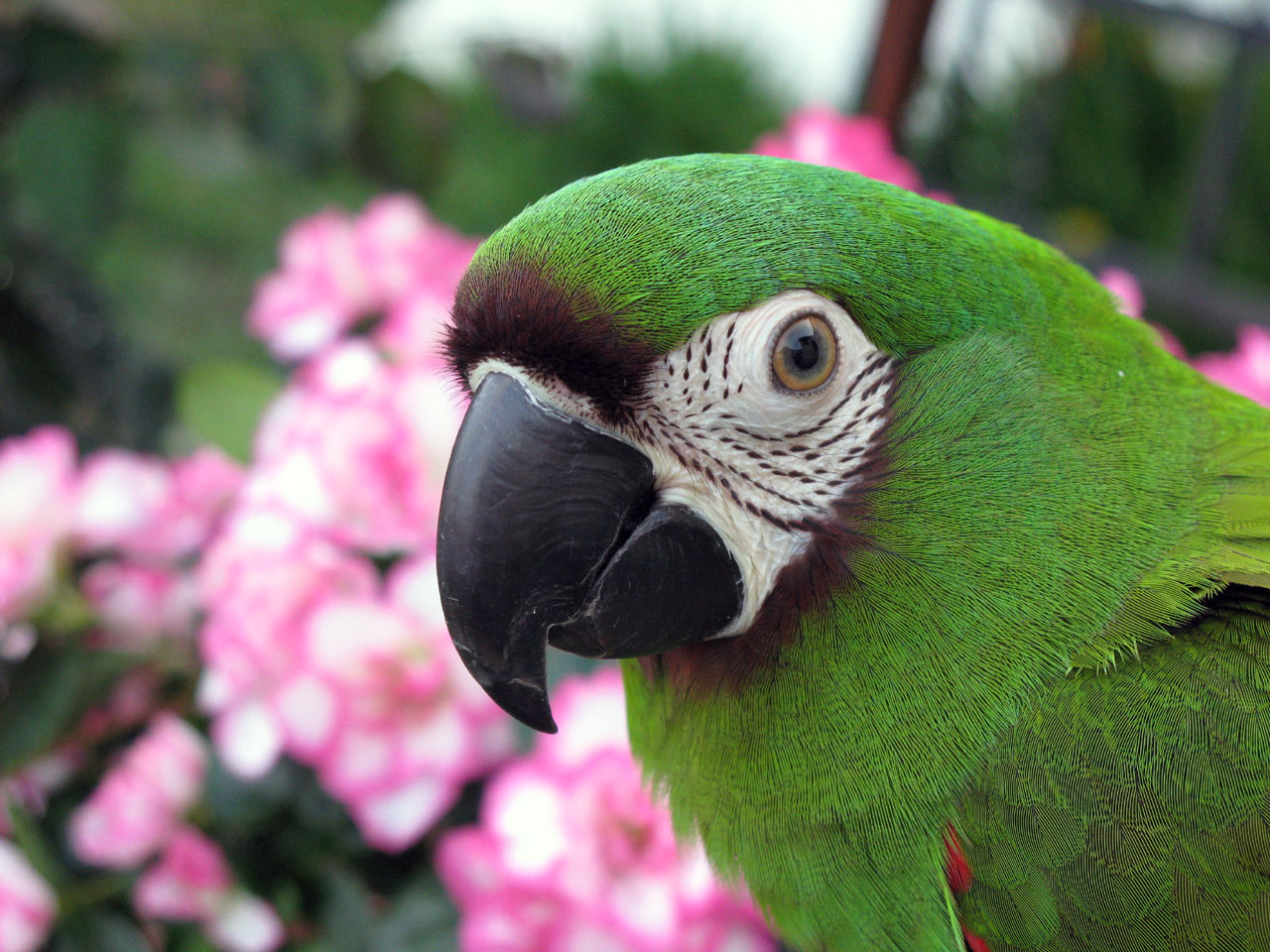
A pet

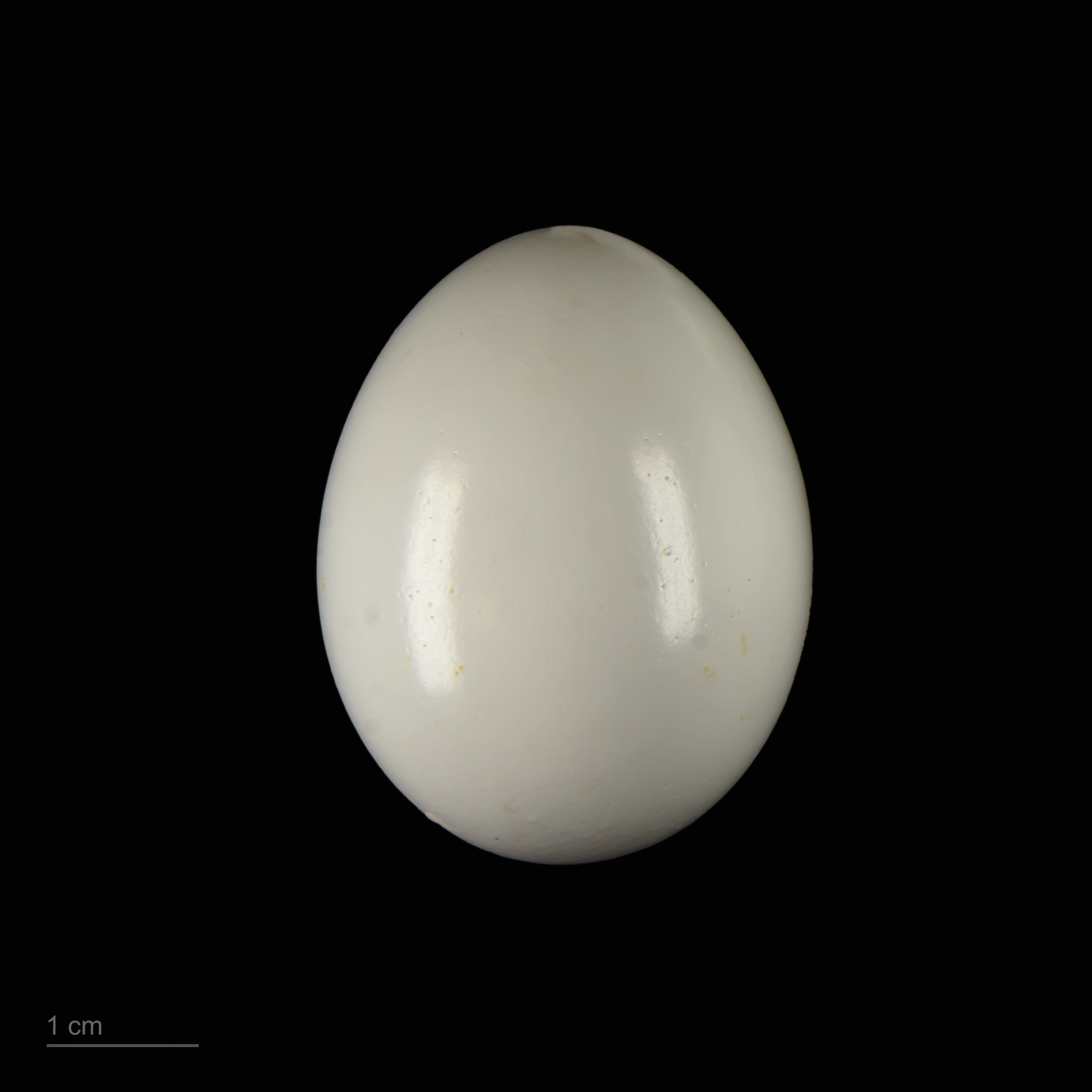
Ara severus - MHNT
