= List of macaws =

The list of macaws includes 19 species of macaws including extinct and critically endangered species, and does not include several hypothetical extinct species that have been proposed based on very little evidence.

== Species in taxonomic order ==
=== Anodorhynchus ===
The three well-established species in the genus Anodorhynchus are monotypic:

Species
Common and binomial names	Image	Description	Range
Glaucous macaw (Anodorhynchus glaucus)		70 cm (27.5 in) long, mostly pale turquoise-blue with a large greyish head. It has a long tail and a large bill. It has a yellow, bare eye-ring and half-moon-shaped lappets bordering the mandible.	South America (probably extinct)
Hyacinth macaw or hyacinthine macaw (Anodorhynchus hyacinthinus)		100 cm (39 in) long, 120-140 cm (48-56 in) wingspan. It is almost entirely blue and has black under the wings. It has a large black beak with bright yellow along the sides of the lower part of the beak and also yellow eyerings.	South America
Lear's macaw or indigo macaw (Anodorhynchus leari)		70 cm (27.5 in) long, mainly blue and the head is a slightly paler blue. It has bare pale yellow skin at the base of its beak and orange-yellow eyerings. It has a large blackish beak.	Brazil

=== Cyanopsitta ===
Cyanopsitta
Common and binomial names	Image	Description	Range
Spix's macaw or little blue macaw (Cyanopsitta spixii)		55–57 cm (22–22 in) long. Various shades of blue, including a pale blue head, pale blue underparts, and vivid blue upperparts, wings and tail.	Brazil (extinct in the wild)

=== Ara ===
Ara
Common and binomial names	Image	Description	Range
Great green macaw or Buffon's macaw (Ara ambiguus)		85–90 cm (33–36 in) long. Mostly green, red on forehead, green and blue wings	Central and South America, from Honduras to Ecuador
Blue-and-yellow macaw or blue-and-gold macaw (Ara ararauna)		80–90 cm (31.5–35.5 in) long. Mostly blue back and yellow front. Blue chin and green forehead. The upper zone of the bare white skin around each eye extending to the beak is patterned by lines of small dark feathers.	Panama, Colombia through to south-central Brazil. Small introduced populations present in Puerto Rico and Miami-Dade County, Florida
Green-winged macaw or red-and-green macaw (Ara chloropterus)		90 cm (36 in) long. Mostly red, with blue and green wings. The bare white skin around each eye extending to the bill is patterned by lines of small red feathers.	South America, from Colombia through to northern Paraguay (formerly northern Argentina)
Blue-throated macaw (Ara glaucogularis)		75–85 cm (30–34 in) long. Blue upperparts and mostly yellow lowerparts, blue throat. Areas of pale skin on the sides of the face are covered with lines of small dark-blue feathers, with pinkish bare skin at the base of the beak.	North Bolivia
Scarlet macaw (Ara macao)		81–96 cm (32–36 in) long. Mostly bright red, with red, yellow and blue in the wings. There is bare white skin around the each eye extending to the bill.	Mexico to Colombia and the Amazon Basin.
Military macaw (Ara militaris)		70 cm (28 in) long. Mostly green, red forehead	Discontinuous distribution in Mexico and along the Andes from Venezuela to north Argentina.
Red-fronted macaw (Ara rubrogenys)		55–60 cm (21.5–23.5 in) long. Mostly green. red forehead and red patch over the ears, pinkish skin on the face, red at bend of wings, blue primary wing feathers	Central Bolivia
Chestnut-fronted macaw or severe macaw (Ara severus)		46 cm (18 in) long. Mostly green, chestnut forehead, red at bend of wings	Panama and South America in the Chocó and Amazon Basin
†Cuban macaw (Ara tricolor); Extinct ca. 1885		50 cm (20 in) long. Red forehead fading to orange and then to yellow at the nape of the neck, dark brown bill paler at the tip; orange face, chin, chest, abdomen and thighs; upper back mainly brownish red, and the rump and lower back blue; brown, red and purplish-blue wing feathers; upper surface of the tail was dark red fading to blue at the tip, and brownish red underneath.	Extinct - formerly endemic on Cuba and probably also on Isla de la Juventud (previously called the Isle of Pines).
†St. Croix macaw (Ara autocthones); Extinct		Only known from sub-fossil bones found at two archeological sites.	Extinct - Saint Croix, U.S. Virgin Islands and central Puerto Rico

=== Orthopsittaca ===
Orthopsittaca
Common and binomial names	Image	Description	Range
Red-bellied macaw (Orthopsittaca manilata)		46 cm (18 in) long, mainly green, burgundy red patch on the belly, blue forehead and upper wings, and a grey tint to the breast. The underwings and undertail are dull yellow. Bare mustard yellow skin covers most of its face.	South America

=== Primolius ===
Primolius
Common and binomial names	Image	Description	Range
Blue-headed macaw or Coulon's macaw (Primolius couloni)		41 cm (16 in) long, mostly green with head, flight feathers and primary coverts blue. The uppertail has a maroon base, a narrow green center and a blue tip. The undertail and underwing are greenish-yellow/ The bill is pale greyish-horn with a black base. Unlike most other macaws, the facial skin and lores are dark greyish.	South America
Blue-winged macaw or Illiger's macaw (Primolius maracana)		40 cm (16 in) long, mostly green, the upperside of some of the wing feathers are blue, and the underside of the wings are yellowish, the tail-tip, crown and cheeks are bluish, and the tail-base and a belly-patch are red. The iris is amber. The bare facial-skin is yellowish, which may be white in captivity, the beak is all black	South America
Golden-collared macaw or yellow-collared macaw (Primolius auricollis)		38 cm (15 in) long, mostly green, yellow band on the back of the neck, tail feathers have are red at the base fading to greens and blues, dark brown or black forehead, pink legs, the beak is dark grey with a paler grey tip	South America

=== Diopsittaca ===
Diopsittaca
Common and binomial names	Image	Description	Range
Red-shouldered macaw or Hahn's macaw (Diopsittaca nobilis)		30 cm (12 in) long, mostly green, with dark or slate blue feathers on the forehead and crown. The wings and tail have feathers that are bright green above and olive-green below. The leading edges of the wings, especially on the underside, are red. The irises are orange, and the featherless skin on the face is white. There are three subspecies.	South America

== See also ==
- List of Amazon parrots
- List of parrots
- Macaws
