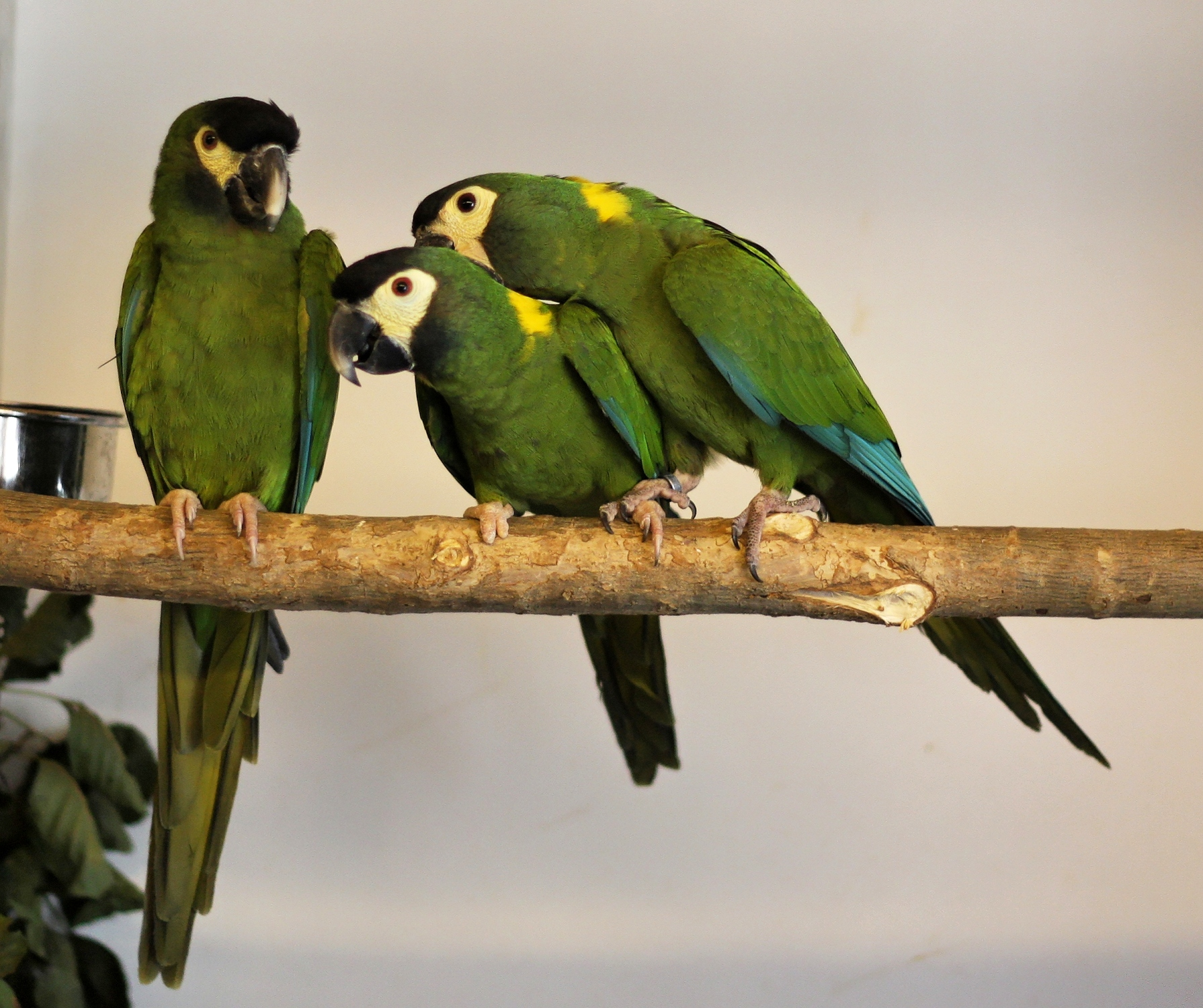

Conservation status
- Least Concern (IUCN 3.1)

Scientific classification
- Kingdom: Animalia
- Phylum: Chordata
- Class: Aves
- Order: Psittaciformes
- Family: Psittacidae
- Genus: Primolius
- Species: P. auricollis

Binomial name
- Primolius auricollis (Cassin, 1853)

= Golden-collared macaw =

Yellow-collared macaw

Species of bird

The golden-collared macaw or yellow-collared macaw (Primolius auricollis) is a small, mostly green Central South American parrot, a member of a large group of Neotropical parrots known as macaws. It has a bright yellow patch on the back of its neck/upper shoulders that gives the species its name. In aviculture, it is one of a number of smaller macaws often called "mini-macaws".

== Taxonomy ==
The yellow-collared macaw was described by American ornithologist John Cassin in 1853. In fact, some literature refers to it as Cassin's macaw or the yellow-naped macaw. Its specific epithet auricollis meaning gold-collared, from the Latin aurum 'gold', and collum 'neck'. In recent years it has often been placed in the genus Propyrrhura, but this is incorrect as per ICZN rules. Earlier, it had also been placed in the genus Ara.

== Description ==
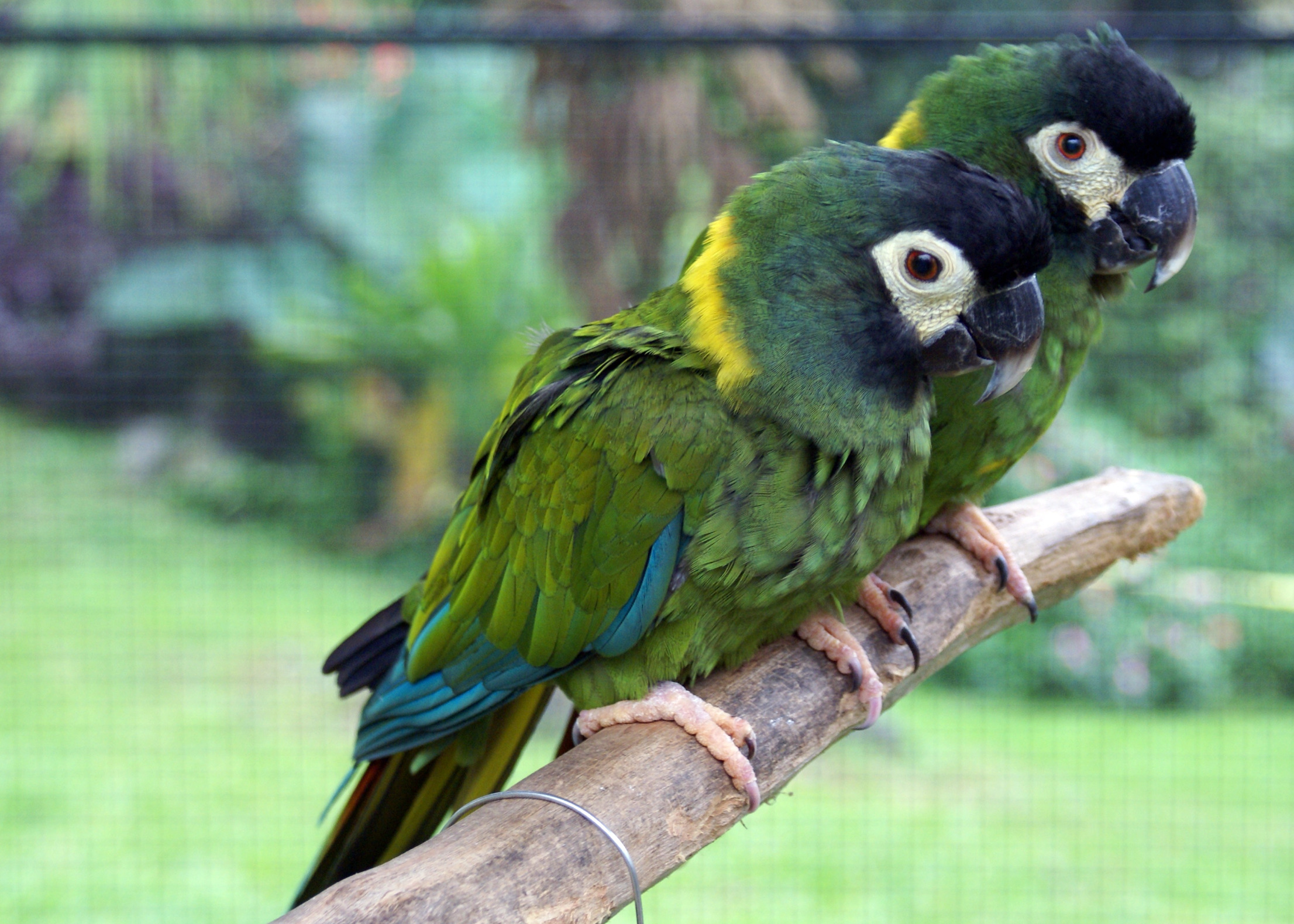
Two at Pana'ewa Rainforest Zoo, Hawaii, US

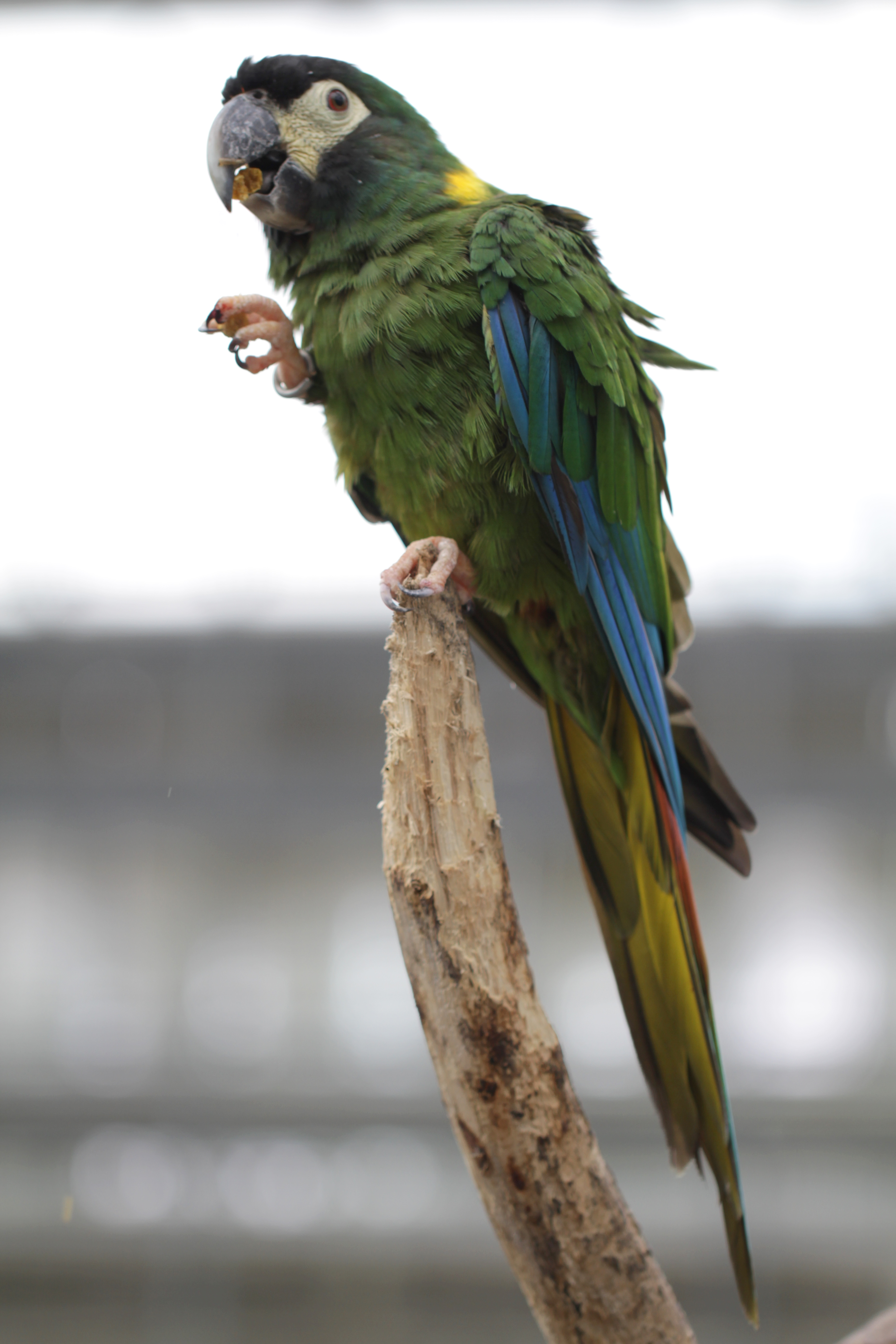
At Kakegawa Kacho-en, Japan

It has a total length of about 38 cm (15 in), of which almost half is tail feathers. The general plumage is green, with a distinct yellow collar that is broadest on the back of the neck. The yellow collar develops as the bird ages, with more vibrant colors found in mature birds. The front and crown is brownish black. The remiges and primary coverts are blue and the long, pointed tail has a red base, a narrow green center and a blue tip. The underside of the tail and flight feathers are greenish-yellow, similar to that of several other small macaws such as the blue-winged and red-bellied macaw. The legs are a dull pinkish color, and the iris is reddish to dull yellow. It has extensive bare white facial skin and the heavy bill is black, often tipped pale grey.

== Distribution and habitat ==
The main population occurs in the Pantanal of Brazil (south-western Mato Grosso, western Mato Grosso do Sul and southern Rondônia), northern Argentina (eastern Jujuy and northern Salta), far northern Paraguay (Alto Paraguay and Concepción) and most of northern and eastern Bolivia (Beni, Santa Cruz, Chuquisaca and Tarija). A second disjunct population occurs in far north-eastern Mato Grosso, south-eastern Pará and western Tocantins in Brazil.

It occurs in forest (but avoids the Amazon rainforest), woodland, savanna and grassland with scattered trees. It mainly occurs in lowlands, but locally up to an altitude of 1,700 m (5,600 ft).

=== Conservation status ===
It is generally fairly common and therefore considered to be of least concern by BirdLife International. The species is listed in CITES Appendix II, which means that commercial trade is allowed with an export permit (plus an import permit if required by laws of the importer's country).

=== Behavior ===
Typically seen in pairs or, during non-breeding season, small flocks.

=== Domestic pet behavior ===
As a domestic pet, a yellow collared is extremely social and demands attention. It requires about three to four hours per day of interaction. When properly cared for they can live up to fifty years.

=== Temperament ===
The yellow-collared macaw is known for its intelligence. They have an extensive vocabulary and can be unpredictable as well.This bird has known to get aggressive when not paid attention.

=== Feeding ===
Feeds on fruits, flower buds and seeds.

=== Breeding ===
The yellow-collared macaw nest in a hole in a tree. The eggs are white and there are usually two or three in a clutch. The female incubates the eggs for about 26 days, and the chicks fledge from the nest about 70 days after hatching.

== See also ==
- List of macaws
