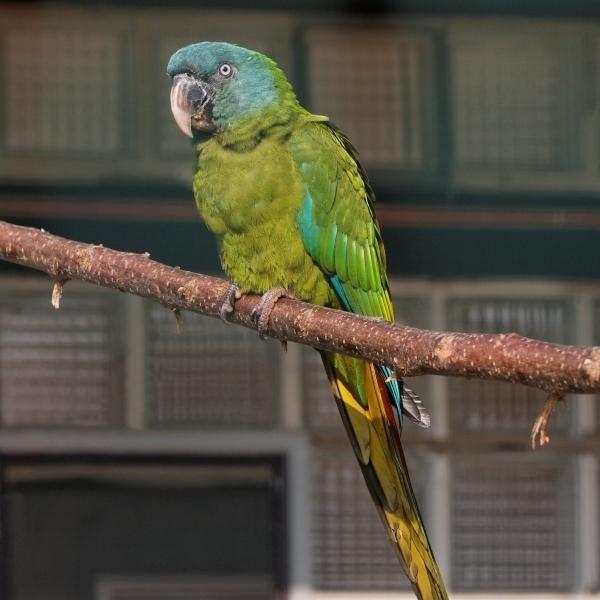
- Blue-headed macaw, Primolius couloni

Scientific classification
- Kingdom: Animalia
- Phylum: Chordata
- Class: Aves
- Order: Psittaciformes
- Family: Psittacidae
- Tribe: Arini
- Genus: Primolius; Bonaparte, 1857

Type species
- Ara auricollis Cassin, 1853

Species
- P. couloni (P. L. Sclater, 1876); P. maracana (Vieillo, 1816); P. auricollis (Cassin, 1853)

Synonyms
- Propyrrhura Ribeiro, 1920

= Primolius =

Genus of birds

Primolius is a genus of macaws comprising three species, which are native to South America. They are mainly green parrots with complex colouring including blues, reds and yellows. They have long tails, a large curved beak, and bare facial skin typical of macaws in general. They are less than 50 cm (20 in) long, much smaller than the macaws of the Ara genus. Macaws less than about 50 cm long, including the genus Primolius, are sometimes called "mini-macaws".

== Taxonomy ==
The genus has three monotypic species:

Genus Primolius, Bonaparte 1857:

- Blue-headed macaw, Primolius couloni (Sclater PL, 1876)
- Blue-winged macaw or Illiger's macaw, Primolius maracana (Vieillot, 1816)
- Golden-collared macaw, Primolius auricollis (Cassin, 1853)

== Species ==
Genus Primolius – Bonaparte, 1857 – two species
Common name	Scientific name and subspecies	Range	Size and ecology	IUCN status and estimated population
Blue-headed macaw or Coulon's macaw	Primolius couloni (P. L. Sclater, 1876)	eastern Peru, northwestern Bolivia (Pando), and far western Brazil (Acre).	Size: 41 centimetres (16 in) long, mostly green with head, flight feathers and primary coverts blue. The uppertail has a maroon base, a narrow green center and a blue tip. The undertail and underwing are greenish-yellow/ The bill is pale greyish-horn with a black base. Unlike most other macaws, the facial skin and lores are dark greyish. Habitat: Diet:	VU
Blue-winged macaw or Illiger's macaw	Primolius maracana (Vieillot, 1816)	Brazil, Paraguay, north-eastern Argentina and east of Bolivia.	Size: 40 centimetres (16 in) long, mostly green, the upperside of some of the wing feathers are blue, and the underside of the wings are yellowish, the tail-tip, crown and cheeks are bluish, and the tail-base and a belly-patch are red. The iris is amber. The bare facial-skin is yellowish, which may be white in captivity, the beak is all black Habitat: Diet:	NT
Golden-collared macaw or yellow-collared macaw	Primolius auricollis (Cassin, 1853)	Brazil (south-western Mato Grosso, western Mato Grosso do Sul and southern Rondônia), northern Argentina (eastern Jujuy and northern Salta), far northern Paraguay (Alto Paraguay and Concepción) and most of northern and eastern Bolivia (Beni, Santa Cruz, Chuquisaca and Tarija)	Size: 38 centimetres (15 in) long, mostly green, yellow band on the back of the neck, tail feathers have are red at the base fading to greens and blues, dark brown or black forehead, pink legs, the beak is dark grey with a paler grey tip Habitat: Diet:	LC

== See also ==
- List of macaws
- List of Vulnerable birds
