= Mini-macaw =

Group of macaw species

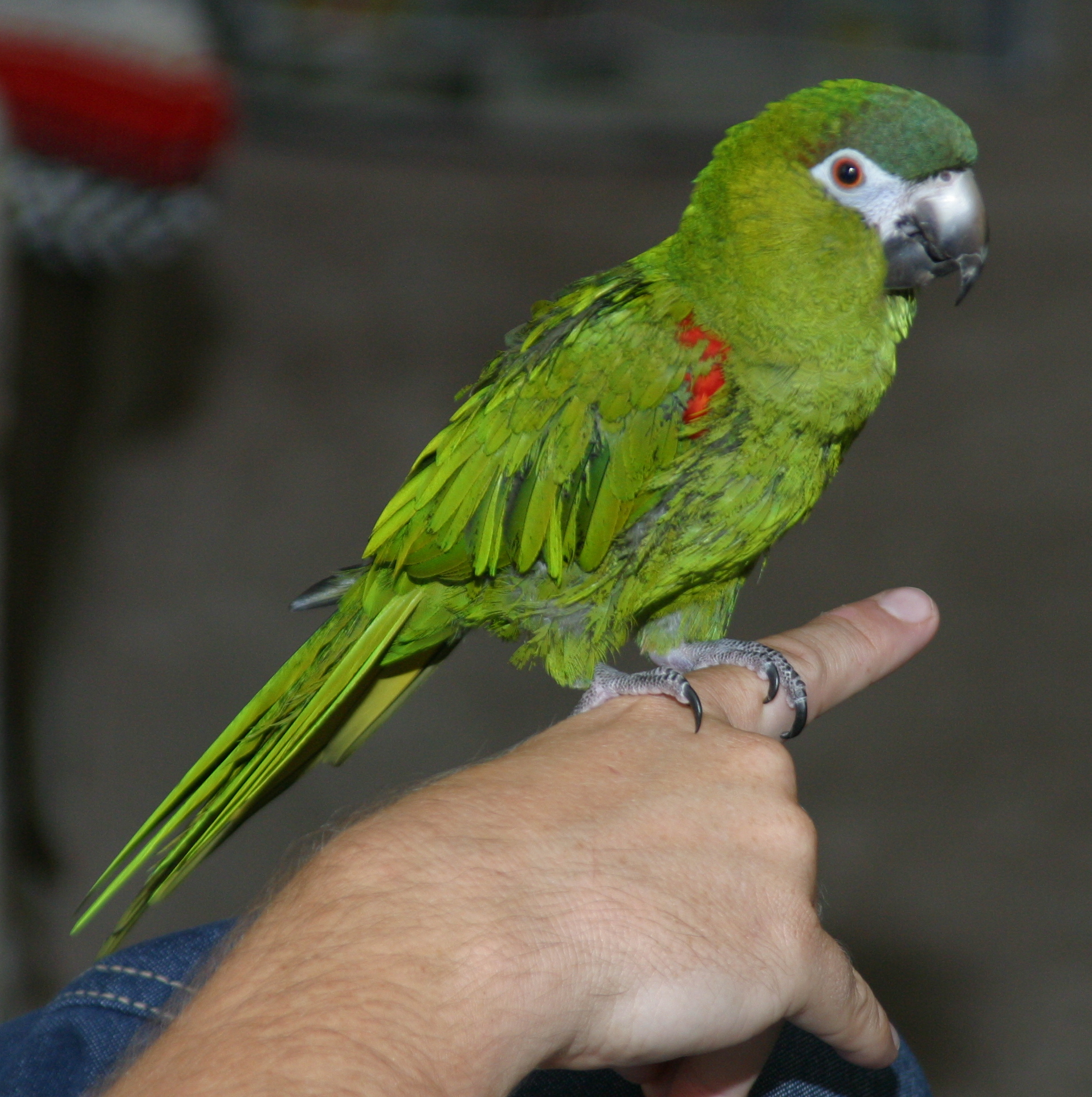
The red-shouldered macaw, at 12–14 inches long, is sometimes called a mini-macaw.

Mini-macaws are a loosely defined group of small-to-medium-sized macaw species within the tribe Arini. The term has no fixed taxonomic meaning and is principally used in aviculture to describe a small macaw belonging to one of a number of different genera, with overall length being the sole criterion for inclusion. Any macaw with an overall length (including the tail) of less than about 50 cm (20 inches) can be described as a "mini-macaw". Additionally, the "mini-" prefix may be added to the species name when describing the bird in question (e.g. "red-shouldered mini-macaw"). Mini-macaws have predominantly green plumage with various accenting colours.

Mini-macaws are explicitly demarcated from large macaws in the Portuguese language by the term "maracanã", as opposed to "arara".

In the pet trade, the term can be used to suggest that the species in question is better suited as a companion parrot for owners with less space in their homes than would be required by one of the larger macaw species, and may be easier to train than larger macaws. However, most mini-macaws (aside from the red-shouldered macaw, which is parakeet sized) are still fairly large parrots and only "mini" in comparison to their larger relatives.

== Species ==
In aviculture the following are sometimes called mini-macaws:

- Chestnut-fronted, or severe macaw, Ara severa
- Golden-collared macaw, Primolius auricollis
- Blue-winged, or Illiger's macaw, Primolius maracana
- Blue-headed macaw, Primolius couloni
- Red-bellied macaw, Orthopsittaca manilata
- Red-shouldered, or Hahn's macaw, Diopsittaca nobilis

The red-bellied macaw and blue-headed macaw are typically only found in captivity in a zoo setting, or as part of a breeding program, and are rarely kept as pets.

== See also ==
- Primolius (A genus of macaws)
