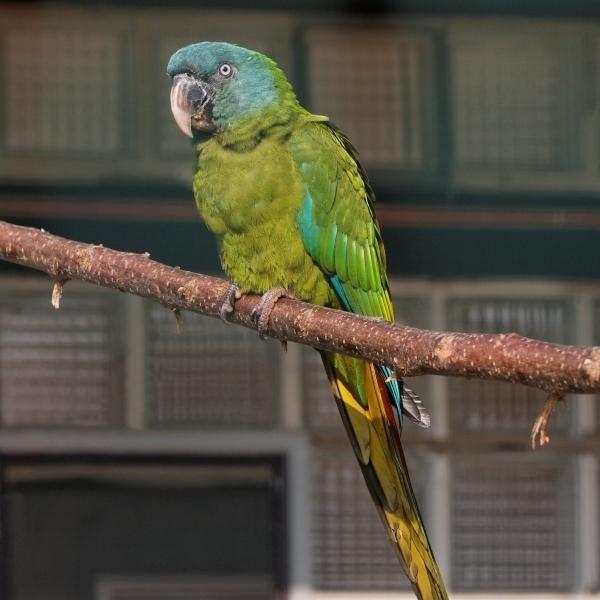
- At Weltvogelpark Walsrode, Germany

Conservation status
- Vulnerable (IUCN 3.1)
- CITES Appendix I

Scientific classification
- Kingdom: Animalia
- Phylum: Chordata
- Class: Aves
- Order: Psittaciformes
- Family: Psittacidae
- Genus: Primolius
- Species: P. couloni

Binomial name
- Primolius couloni (P.L. Sclater, 1876)

= Blue-headed macaw =

Species of bird

The blue-headed macaw or Coulon's macaw (Primolius couloni) is a macaw native to eastern Peru, northwestern Bolivia (mainly in Pando), and far western Brazil (in Acre). It has a total length of about 41 cm (16 in), making it a member of the group of smaller macaws sometimes known as the mini-macaws, which includes any species of macaw with a total length of 50 cm (20 in) or less. As in all macaws, its tail is long and pointed and the bill is large and heavy.

The specific epithet couloni is in honor of Swiss naturalist Paul Louis Coulon (1804–1894).

== Description ==
The blue-headed macaw is 41 cm (16 in) long. It has mainly green plumage (often tinged olive, esp. below) with the head, flight feathers and primary coverts blue. The uppertail has a maroon base, a narrow green center and a blue tip. The undertail and underwing are greenish-yellow similar to that of several other small macaws (e.g. red-bellied and golden-collared macaw). The medium-sized bill is pale greyish-horn with a black base (extent varies, but upper mandible in adults typically appears mainly pale). The iris is whitish with a narrow, often barely visible, maroon eye-ring. Unlike most other macaws, the facial skin and lores are dark greyish. The legs are dull pinkish. Juveniles resemble adults, but with the entire bill black, greyer legs, darker iris and the facial skin and lores white.

== Taxonomy ==
In recent years it has often been placed in the genus Propyrrhura; however, as per ICZN rules, the species is now considered to be in the genus Primolius. Earlier, it has also been placed in the genus Ara, which, at present, is only used for some of the larger macaws.

== Habitat ==
It is found in the south-west Amazon and adjacent east Andean foothills. It prefers openings in humid forest, e.g. along rivers or clearings, but has also been observed in Moriche Palm swamps and outskirts of towns. It occurs from the lowlands up to an altitude of 1550 m (5100 ft). As several other parrots, the blue-headed macaw is known to visit clay-licks.

== Behavior ==
Little is known about its reproductive behavior in the wild, but a possible nest has been recorded in a bamboo cavity and another in a tree cavity. In captivity, the reproductive cycle appears to be roughly annual with a clutch size of 2–4 being the norm. In the wild it is typically seen in groups of 2–4 individuals, with occasional records of groups up to c. 60 individuals. Its call is higher-pitched and softer than that of most other macaws.

== Status ==
Until recently it was considered fairly common, but a review in 2006 by BirdLife International suggested it was rare with a decreasing total population of 1000–2500 individuals. It has therefore been uplisted to endangered in the 2007 IUCN Red List. Parts of the range of this species remain poorly known, but Tobias & Brightsmith (2007) has suggested that previous estimates were too low, with actual number of 9200–46,000 mature individuals more likely. It has therefore been suggested that vulnerable might be a more appropriate category for this species.

Much of the forest within its range remains intact, but habitat loss could be a threat, at least locally. It occurs in several protected areas, e.g. Tambopata-Candamo and Manu.

The capture of individuals for the wild bird trade potentially presents a serious problem. It is rare in captivity and consequently prices are high (US$12,500 but the past few years have declined as low as US$4,000–5,000 in some EU countries). International trade in this species was virtually unknown in 1993, where CITES only registered three legally traded individuals, but this had risen to 55 individuals in 2000. As of August 2007, the International Species Information System listed only 26 individuals in zoos outside its native countries, and Loro Parque (not included on ISIS) has 35+ individuals. CITES reported that approx. 50 illegally held blue-headed macaws were seized throughout the World in 1993–2000, and an investigation in Germany in 2001 resulted in approx. 30 individuals being seized.
