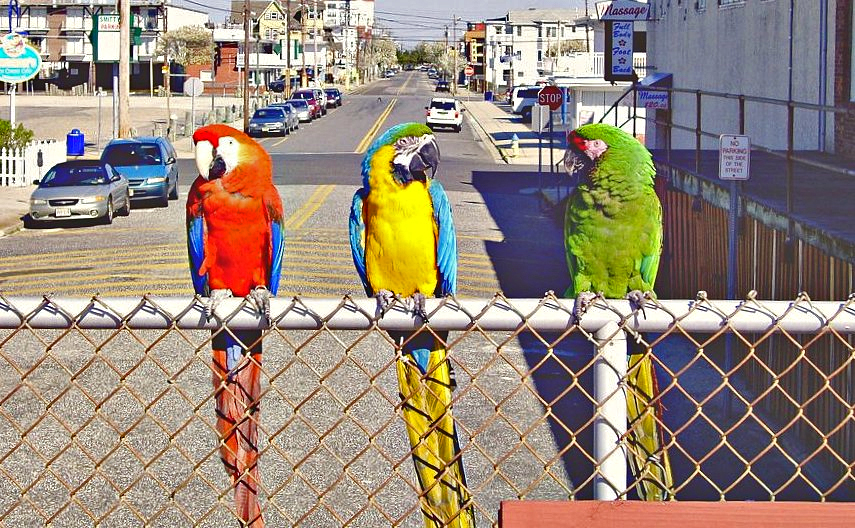
- Scarlet macaw (Ara macao), Blue-and-yellow macaw (Ara ararauna) & Military Macaw (Ara militaris).

Scientific classification
- Kingdom: Animalia
- Phylum: Chordata
- Class: Aves
- Order: Psittaciformes
- Family: Psittacidae
- Subfamily: Arinae
- Tribe: Arini

Groups included
- Anodorhynchus; Ara; Cyanopsitta; Primolius; Orthopsittaca; Diopsittaca

= Macaw =

Group of birds in the parrot family

Macaws are a group of large New World parrots that are long-tailed and often colorful, in the tribe Arini. They are popular in aviculture or as companion parrots, although there are conservation concerns about several species in the wild.

== Biology ==
Of the many different Psittacidae (true parrots) genera, six are classified as macaws: Ara, Anodorhynchus, Cyanopsitta, Primolius, Orthopsittaca, and Diopsittaca. Previously, the members of the genus Primolius were placed in Propyrrhura, but the former is correct in accordance with ICZN rules. In addition, the related macaw-like thick-billed parrot is sometimes referred to as a "macaw", although it is not phylogenetically considered to be a macaw species. Macaws are native to Central America and North America (only Mexico), South America, and formerly the Caribbean. Most species are associated with forests, but others prefer woodland or savannah-like habitats.

Proportionately larger beaks, long tails, and relatively bare, light-coloured medial (facial patch) areas distinguish macaws from other parrots. Sometimes the facial patch is smaller in some species and limited to a yellow patch around the eyes and a second patch near the base of the beak in the members of the genus Anodorhynchus. A macaw's facial feather pattern is as unique as a fingerprint.

The largest macaws are the hyacinth, Buffon's (great green) and green-winged macaws. While still relatively large parrots, mini-macaws of the genera Cyanopsitta, Orthopsittaca and Primolius are significantly smaller than the members of Anodorhynchus and Ara. The smallest macaw species, the red-shouldered macaw, is no larger than some parakeets of the genus Aratinga.

Macaws, like other parrots, toucans and woodpeckers, are zygodactyl, having their first and fourth toes pointing backward.

== Species in taxonomic order ==
There are 19 species of macaws, including extinct and critically endangered species. In addition, there are several hypothetical extinct species that have been proposed based on very little evidence.

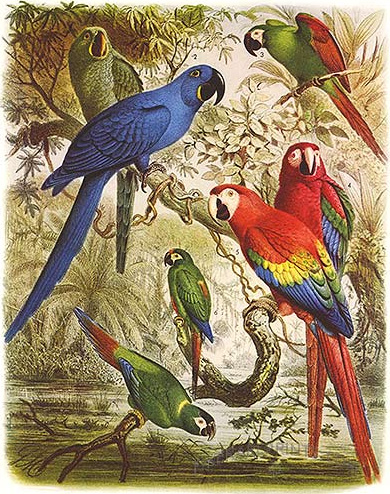
Glaucous macaw (behind hyacinth macaw) and other macaws

- Anodorhynchus
  - Glaucous macaw, Anodorhynchus glaucus (critically endangered or extinct)
  - Hyacinth macaw, Anodorhynchus hyacinthinus
  - Indigo macaw or Lear's macaw, Anodorhynchus leari
- Cyanopsitta
  - Little blue macaw or Spix's macaw, Cyanopsitta spixii (considered extinct in the wild)

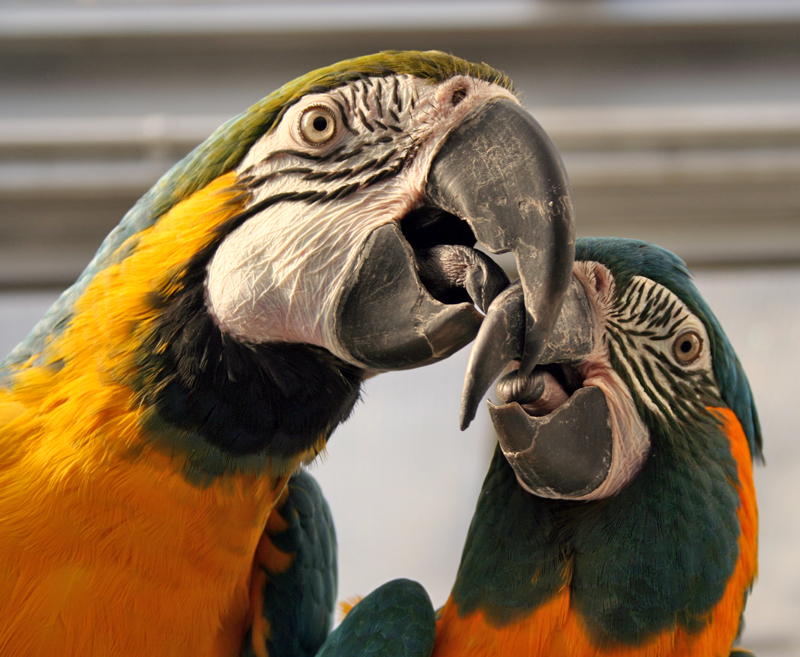
Blue-and-yellow macaw (left) and blue-throated macaw (right)

- Ara
  - Blue-and-yellow macaw or blue-and-gold macaw, Ara ararauna
  - Blue-throated macaw, Ara glaucogularis
  - Military macaw, Ara militaris
  - Great green macaw or Buffon's macaw, Ara ambiguus
  - Scarlet macaw or Aracanga, Ara macao
  - Red-and-green macaw or green-winged macaw, Ara chloropterus
  - Red-fronted macaw, Ara rubrogenys
  - Chestnut-fronted macaw or severe macaw, Ara severus
  - †Cuban red macaw, Ara tricolor (extinct)
  - †Saint Croix macaw, Ara autochthones (extinct)
- Orthopsittaca
  - Red-bellied macaw, Orthopsittaca manilatus
- Primolius
  - Blue-headed macaw, Primolius couloni
  - Blue-winged macaw or Illiger's macaw, Primolius maracana
  - Golden-collared macaw, Primolius auricollis
- Diopsittaca
  - Red-shouldered macaw or Hahn's macaw, Diopsittaca nobilis

=== Hypothetical extinct species ===
Several hypothetical extinct species of macaws have been postulated based on little evidence, and they may have been subspecies, or familiar parrots that were imported onto an island and later wrongly presumed to have a separate identity.

- Martinique macaw, Ara martinica, Rothschild 1905
- Lesser Antillean macaw, Ara guadeloupensis, Clark, 1905
- Jamaican green-and-yellow macaw, Ara erythrocephala, Rothschild 1905
- Jamaican red macaw, Ara gossei, Rothschild 1905
- Dominican green-and-yellow macaw, Ara atwoodi, Clark, 1905

== Extinctions and conservation status ==
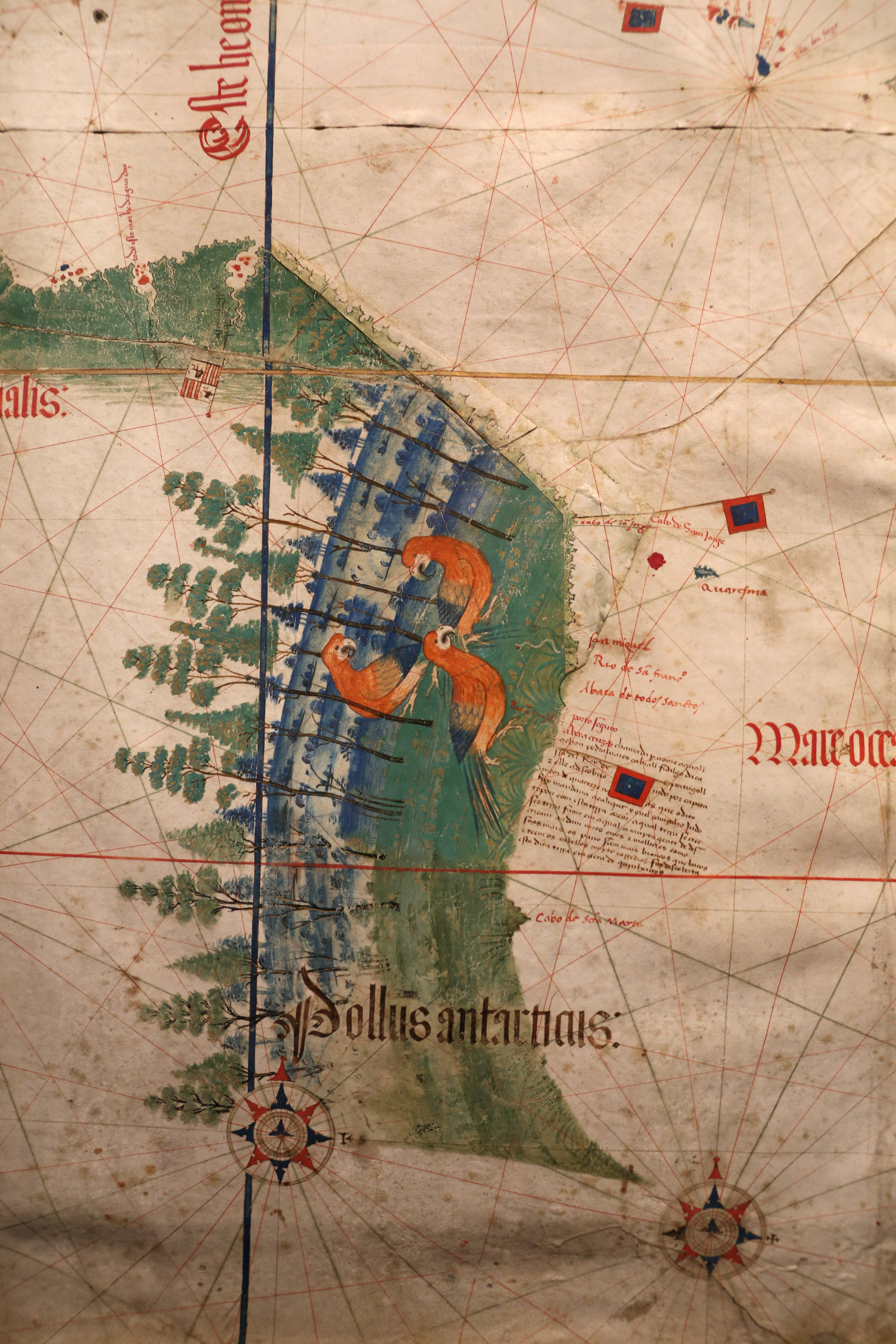
The Brazilian coast in the 1502 Cantino planisphere, possibly the earliest European depiction of macaws

The majority of macaws are now endangered in the wild and a few are extinct. The Spix's macaw is now most likely extinct in the wild. The glaucous macaw is also probably extinct, with only two reliable records of sightings in the 20th century. The greatest problems threatening the macaw population are the rapid rate of deforestation and illegal trapping for the bird trade. Prehistoric Native Americans in the American Southwest farmed macaws in establishments known as "feather factories".

International trade of all macaw species is regulated by the Convention on International Trade in Endangered Species of Wild Flora and Fauna (CITES). Some species of macaws—the scarlet macaw (Ara macao) as an example—are listed in the CITES Appendix I and may not be lawfully traded for commercial purposes. Other species, such as the red-shouldered macaw (Diopsittaca nobilis), are listed in Appendix II and may legally be traded commercially provided that certain controls are in place, including a non-detriment finding, establishment of an export quota, and issuing of export permits.

== Hybrids ==
Sometimes macaws are hybridized for the pet trade.

Aviculturists have reported an over-abundance of female blue-and-yellow macaws in captivity, which differs from the general rule with captive macaws and other parrots, where the males are more abundant. This would explain why the blue and gold is the most commonly hybridised macaw, and why the hybridising trend took hold among macaws. Common macaw hybrids include the harlequin (Ara ararauna × Ara chloroptera), miligold macaw (Ara ararauna × Ara militaris) and the Catalina (known as the rainbow in Australia, Ara ararauna × Ara macao). In addition, unusual but apparently healthy intergeneric hybrids between the hyacinth macaw and several of the larger Ara macaws have also occasionally been seen in captivity. Another, much rarer, occurrence of a second-generation hybrid (F2) is the miliquin macaw (harlequin and military macaws).

== Diet and clay licks ==
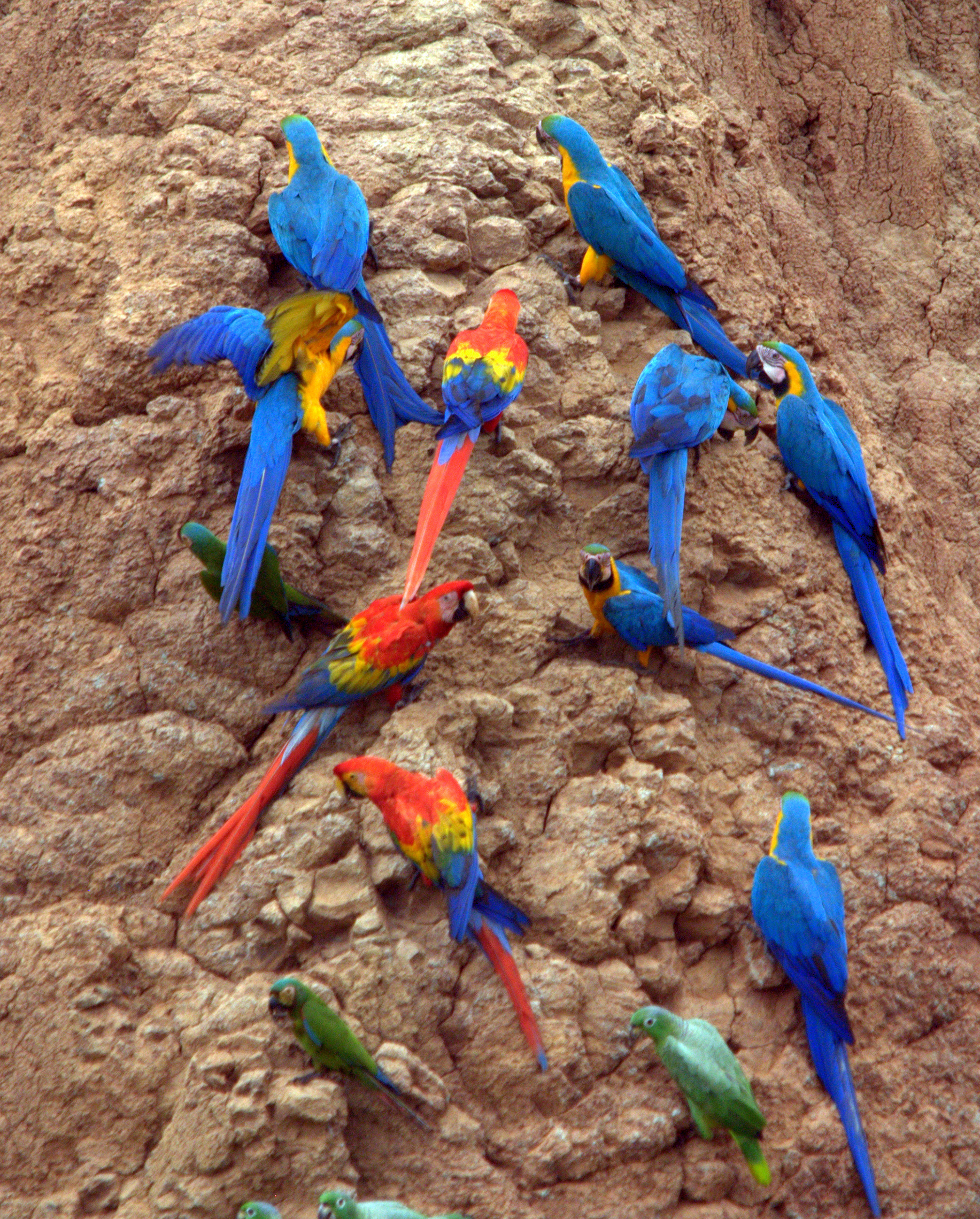
Macaws and Southern mealy amazons at a clay lick in Tambopata National Reserve, Peru

Macaws eat a variety of foods including seeds, nuts, fruits, palm fruits, leaves, flowers, young shoots, and stems. Safe vegetables include asparagus, beets, bell peppers, broccoli, butternut, carrots, corn on the cob, dandelion greens, collard greens, hot peppers, spinach, sweet potatoes, tomatoes and zucchini. Wild species may forage widely, over 100 km (62 mi) for some of the larger species such as Ara araurana (blue and yellow macaw) and Ara ambigua (great green macaw), in search of seasonally available foods.

Some foods eaten by macaws in certain regions in the wild are said to contain toxic or caustic substances which they are able to digest. It has been suggested that parrots and macaws in the Amazon Basin eat clay from exposed river banks to neutralize these toxins. In the western Amazon hundreds of macaws and other parrots descend to exposed river banks to consume clay on an almost daily basis – except on rainy days. Donald Brightsmith, the principal investigator of The Macaw Society, located at the Tambopata Research Center (TRC) in Peru, has studied the clay eating behaviour of parrots at clay licks in Peru. He and fellow investigators found that the soils macaws choose to consume at the clay licks do not have higher levels of cation-exchange capacity (ability to absorb toxins) than that of unused areas of the clay licks and thus the parrots could not be using the clay to neutralize ingested food toxins. Rather, the macaws and other bird and animal species prefer clays with higher levels of sodium. Sodium is a vital element that is scarce in environments greater than 100 kilometres from the ocean. The distribution of clay licks across South America further supports this hypothesis – as the largest and most species-rich clay licks are found on the western side of the Amazon Basin far from oceanic influences. Salt-enriched (NaCl) oceanic aerosols are the main source of environmental sodium near coasts and this decreases drastically farther inland.

Clay-eating behaviour by macaws is not seen outside the western Amazon region, even though macaws in these areas consume some toxic foods such as the seeds of Hura crepitans, or sandbox tree, which have toxic sap. Species of parrot that consume more seeds, which potentially have more toxins, do not use clay licks more than species that eat a greater proportion of flowers or fruit in their diets.

Studies at TRC have shown a correlation between clay-lick use and the breeding season. Contents of nestling crop samples show a high percentage of clay fed to them by their parents. Calcium for egg development – another hypothesis – does not appear to be a reason for geophagy during this period as peak usage is after the hatching of eggs.

Another theory is that the birds, as well as other herbivorous animals, use the clay licks as a source of cobalamin, otherwise known as vitamin B_{12}.

== Relationship with humans ==
Macaws and their feathers have attracted the attention of people throughout history, most notably in pre-Columbian civilizations such as the Inca, Wari', and Nazca. Macaw feathers were highly desired for their bright colors and acquired through hunting and trade. Feathers were often used as adornment and were found at both ceremonial and burial sites. South American weavers have used their feathers to create a number of textiles, most notably feathered panels and tabards. Due to the fragile nature of the feathers, many of these pieces have begun to deteriorate over time.

Advanced genomic and isotopic analyses of ancient featherworks have provided direct evidence of the scale and complexity of this ancient trade. During the Late Intermediate Period (ca. 1000–1470 CE), coastal polities such as the Ychsma at the Pachacamac site in Peru acquired live macaws, including the Scarlet Macaw, Blue-and-yellow Macaw, and Red-and-green Macaw. Rather than simply trading the harvested feathers, these societies transported the live birds across the formidable Andes mountain range from wild populations in the Amazon basin, sustaining them on a coastal diet to secure a continuous supply of brilliant feathers for elite funerary bundles.

== Gallery ==
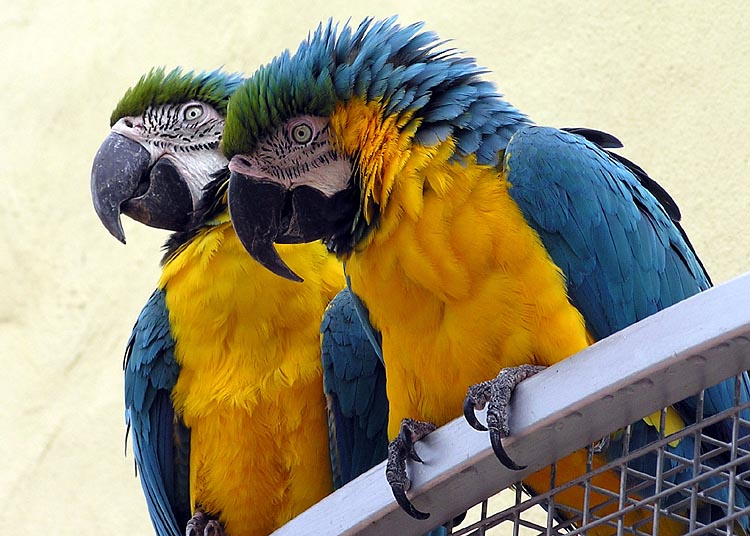
Blue-and-yellow macaws (Ara ararauna)

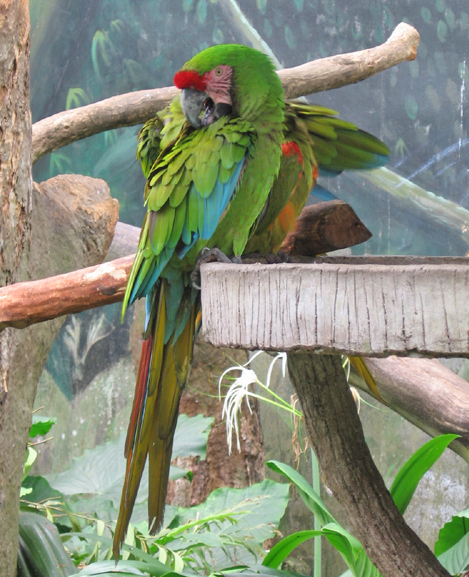
Military macaw (Ara militaris)

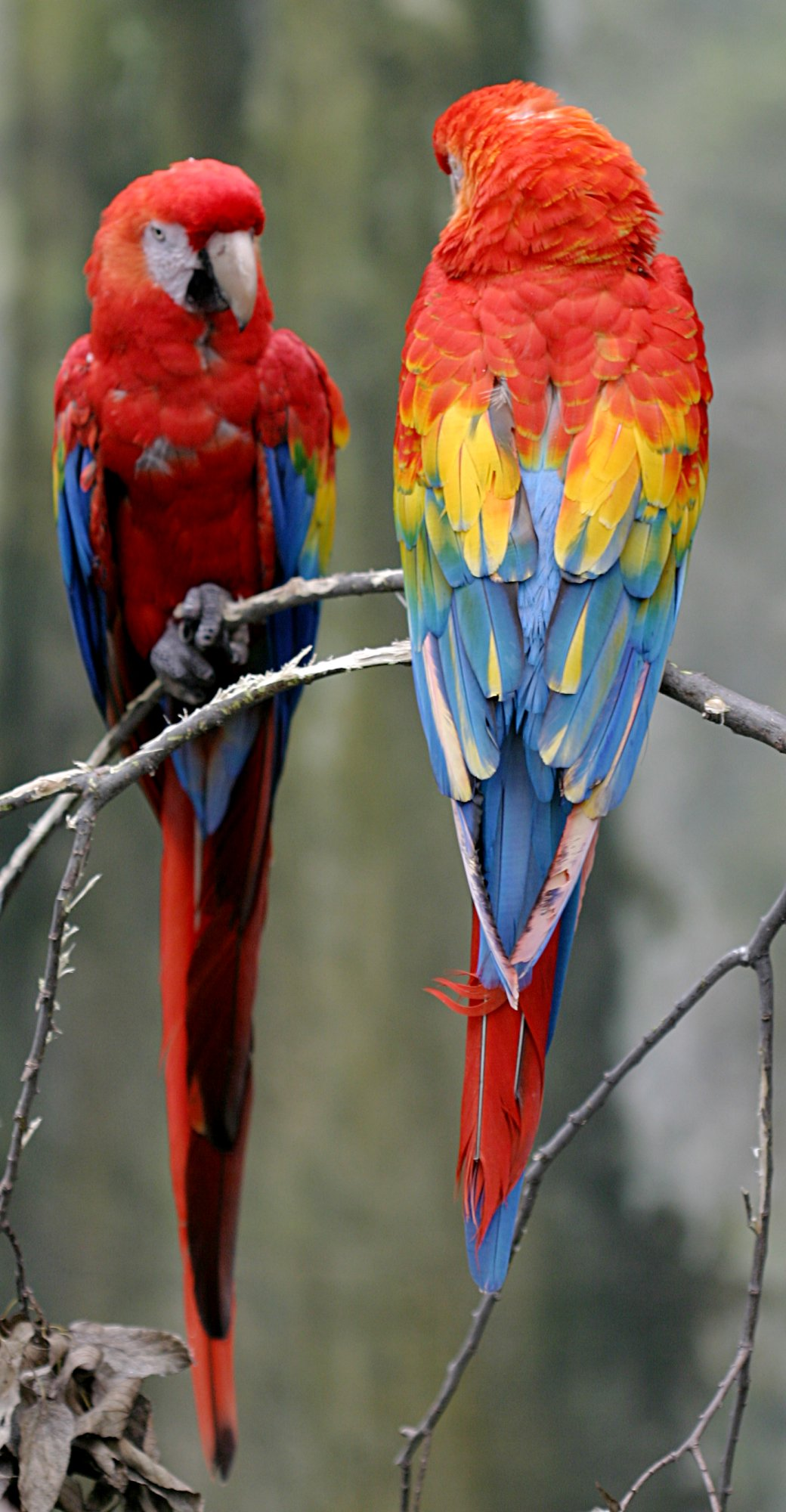
Wing clipped scarlet macaws (Ara macao)

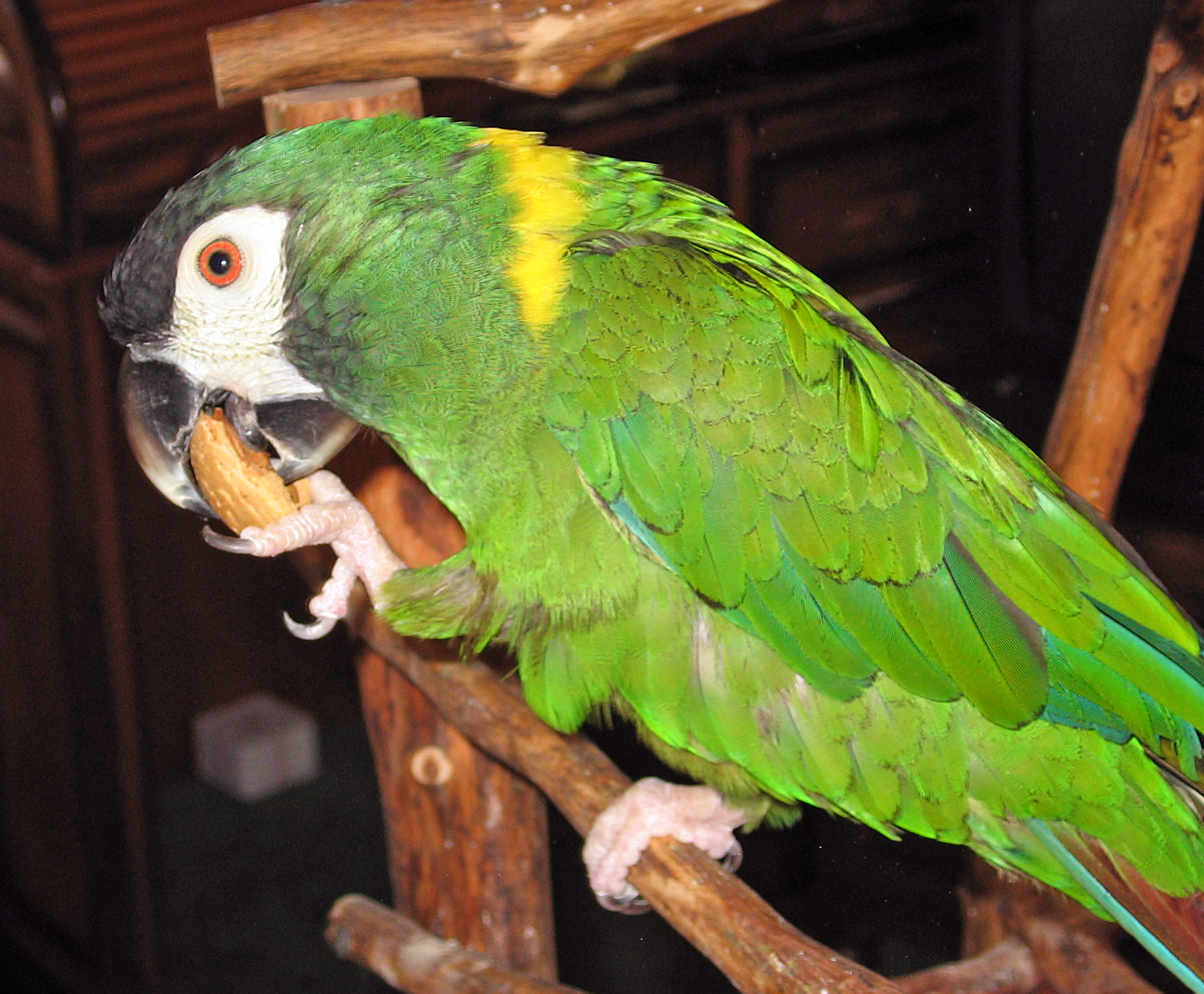
Golden-collared macaw (Primolius auricollis)

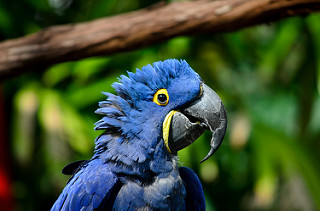
Hyacinth macaw

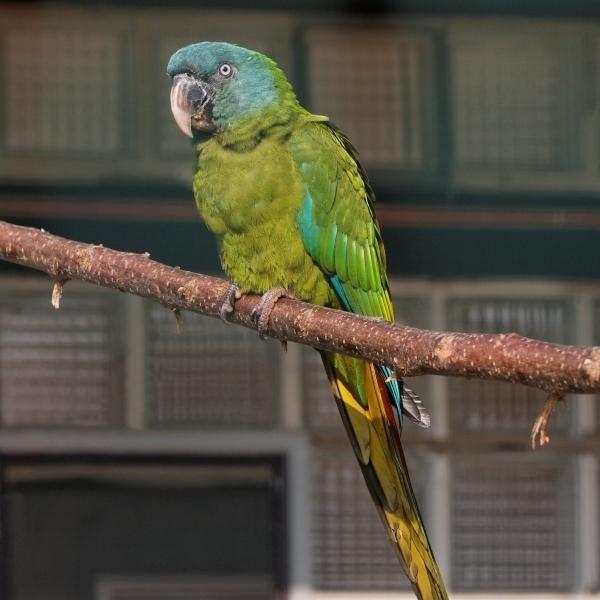
Blue-headed macaw (Primolius couloni)
