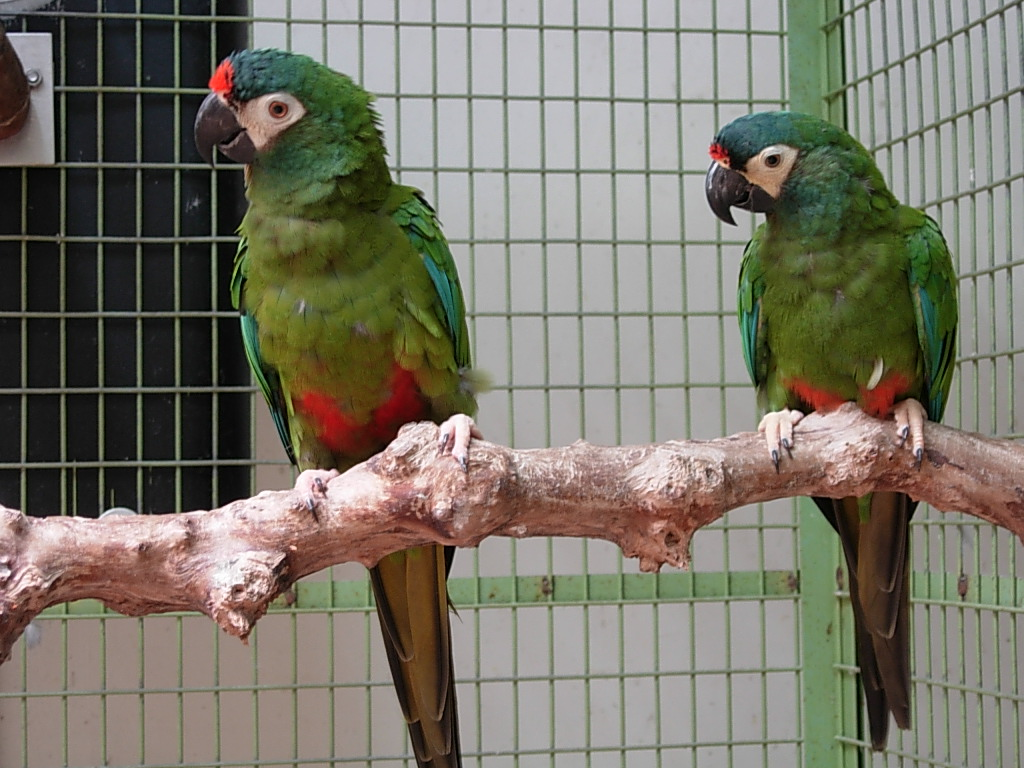

Conservation status
- Least Concern (IUCN 3.1)
- CITES Appendix I

Scientific classification
- Kingdom: Animalia
- Phylum: Chordata
- Class: Aves
- Order: Psittaciformes
- Family: Psittacidae
- Genus: Primolius
- Species: P. maracana

Binomial name
- Primolius maracana (Vieillot, 1816)

= Blue-winged macaw =

Species of bird

The blue-winged macaw (Primolius maracana), in aviculture more commonly known as Illiger's macaw, is a species of small macaw (sometimes called a mini-macaw) found in central and eastern South America. The second name is in honor of the German ornithologist Johann Karl Wilhelm Illiger. It was previously placed in the genera Ara or Propyrrhura. Blue-winged macaws have been known to reach an age of 50–60 years.

== Description ==
It has a total length of approximately 36–43 cm (14–17 in). It has a moderately sized black bill, a long tail and a mainly green plumage. The upperside of the remiges and primary coverts are blue, as indicated by its common name. The underside of the wings is yellowish, the tail-tip, crown and cheeks are bluish, and the tail-base and small belly-patch are red. The iris is amber. It and the red-bellied macaw are the only macaws where the bare facial-skin is yellowish, but this often fades to white in captivity. Unlike the red-bellied macaw, the blue-winged has a red lower abdomen and a red lower back. In the wild, its flight pattern is said to be a distinctive "jerky, rearing motion".

== Habitat and food ==
The blue-winged macaw occurs in eastern and southern Brazil (with a remnant population north-east), eastern Paraguay and, at least formerly, in far north-eastern Argentina and east of Bolivia. It occurs in evergreen and deciduous forests, with a preference for gallery forest. They mainly feed on seeds of Cnidoscolus phyllacanthus, Jatropha, Guazuma ulmifolia, and the non-native Melia azedarach. However, the birds also feed on fruits and nuts.

== Breeding ==
The blue-winged macaw attain sexual maturity between 2 and 4 years after they are born. Adult females usually produce two eggs which take approximately 29 days to hatch. Young blue-winged macaws learn to fly about 11 weeks after they have hatched. They stay with their parents for about a year after learning to fly. Relatively little information exists on its reproduction in the wild, but the breeding season in north-eastern Brazil is apparently from December to February. However, in 1990, a female blue-winged macaw was discovered with a male Spix's macaw in a site.

== Threats ==
These birds are affected mostly by deforestation. They were also captured for the cagebird trade—from 1977 to 1979, 183 birds arrived at the United States from Paraguay. It has declined in the southern part of its range, and there are no recent records from Misiones Province in Argentina where many were killed by farmers who considered them pests. Therefore, it was previously considered vulnerable. Information from Brazil suggests it remains widespread and has even re-colonised areas in its historical range in southern Rio de Janeiro. This has led to it being downlisted to near threatened.

== Aviculture ==
The blue-winged macaw is sometimes kept by humans as an aviary bird or companion parrot. An intensely social bird and a strong flier, this macaw does best when housed with other birds (whether other blue-winged macaws or member of a different parrot species) and given plenty of space in which to fly. It is also an avid chewer and may damage its keeper's property unless provided with wooden destructible objects to occupy its time. Captive breeding of this species is encouraged, due to conservation concerns. If kept as a pet, the blue-winged macaw can bond strongly with humans and some individuals may even begin to mirror their owner's emotional state.
