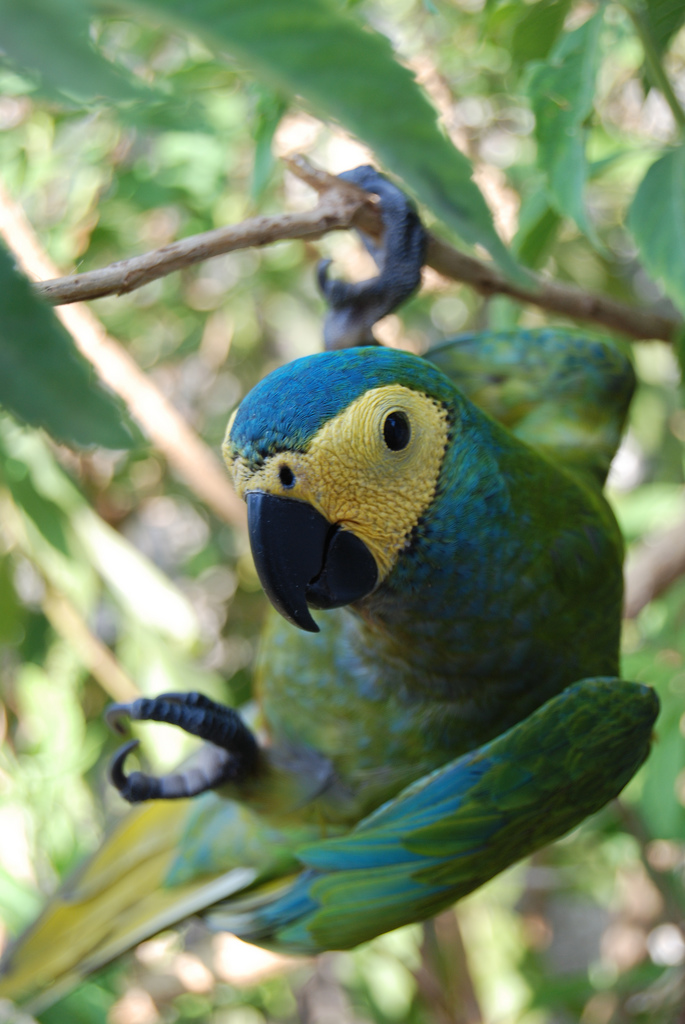
- In Goiânia, Brazil

Conservation status
- Least Concern (IUCN 3.1)

Scientific classification
- Kingdom: Animalia
- Phylum: Chordata
- Class: Aves
- Order: Psittaciformes
- Family: Psittacidae
- Tribe: Arini
- Genus: Orthopsittaca; Ridgway, 1912
- Species: O. manilatus

Binomial name
- Orthopsittaca manilatus (Boddaert, 1783)

Synonyms
- Orthopsittaca manilata

= Red-bellied macaw =

Species of bird

The red-bellied macaw (Orthopsittaca manilatus), also known as Guacamaya manilata, is a medium-sized, mostly green parrot, a member of a group of large Neotropical parrots known as macaws. It is the largest of what are commonly called "mini-macaws". The belly has a large maroon patch which gives the species its name.

It is endemic to tropical Amazonian South America (as well as the Caribbean island of Trinidad), from Colombia south to Amazonian Peru and Bolivia, and central Brazil as far as the northwestern cerrado. Its habitat is moriche (or buriti) palm (Mauritia flexuosa) swamp forests and sandy savannahs with palm groves. They are critically dependent on the Moriche palm for roosting, feeding and nesting. Although the bird is locally common, in places it has been adversely affected by clearing of the palms for use as posts, or to allow cattle ranching; also by capture for the pet trade.

Not to be confused with the African red-bellied parrot (Poicephalus rufiventris), a similarly named smaller parrot.

== Taxonomy ==
The red-bellied macaw was described by the French polymath Georges-Louis Leclerc, Comte de Buffon in 1780 in his Histoire Naturelle des Oiseaux from a specimen collected in Cayenne, French Guiana. The bird was also illustrated in a hand-coloured plate engraved by François-Nicolas Martinet in the Planches Enluminées D'Histoire Naturelle which was produced under the supervision of Edme-Louis Daubenton to accompany Buffon's text. Neither the plate caption nor Buffon's description included a scientific name but in 1783 the Dutch naturalist Pieter Boddaert coined the binomial name Psittacus manilatus in his catalogue of the Planches Enluminées. The red-bellied macaw is now the only species placed in the genus Orthopsittaca that was introduced by the American ornithologist Robert Ridgway in 1912. The species is monotypic. The generic name combines the Ancient Greek orthos meaning "straight" and psittakē meaning "parrot". The specific epithet combines the Latin manus meaning "hand" and latus meaning "broad" or "wide".

== Description ==
The red-bellied macaw is medium-sized, about 300 g (11 oz) in weight and about 46 cm (18 in) in length including its long pointed tail. The plumage is mostly green; the cere and much of the face are covered with bare mustard-yellow skin, and the irises are dark brown. The forehead is bluish. The chin, throat and upper chest are greyish with some green scalloping, and the lower abdomen ("belly") has a large maroon patch. The tail is long and tapered. The underwings and undertail are dull olive yellow. Adults have dark-grey beaks. The legs and feet are dark grey. In common with other parrots, they have zygodactyl feet, two toes pointing forward and two backward. Males and females have identical plumage, but males are usually larger and have larger heads. Juveniles are duller in colour than adults and have a grey beak with a conspicuous white mid-line stripe running along the length of the culmen (top of the upper beak). The Spix's macaw is the only other macaw in which juveniles have a similar white culmen.

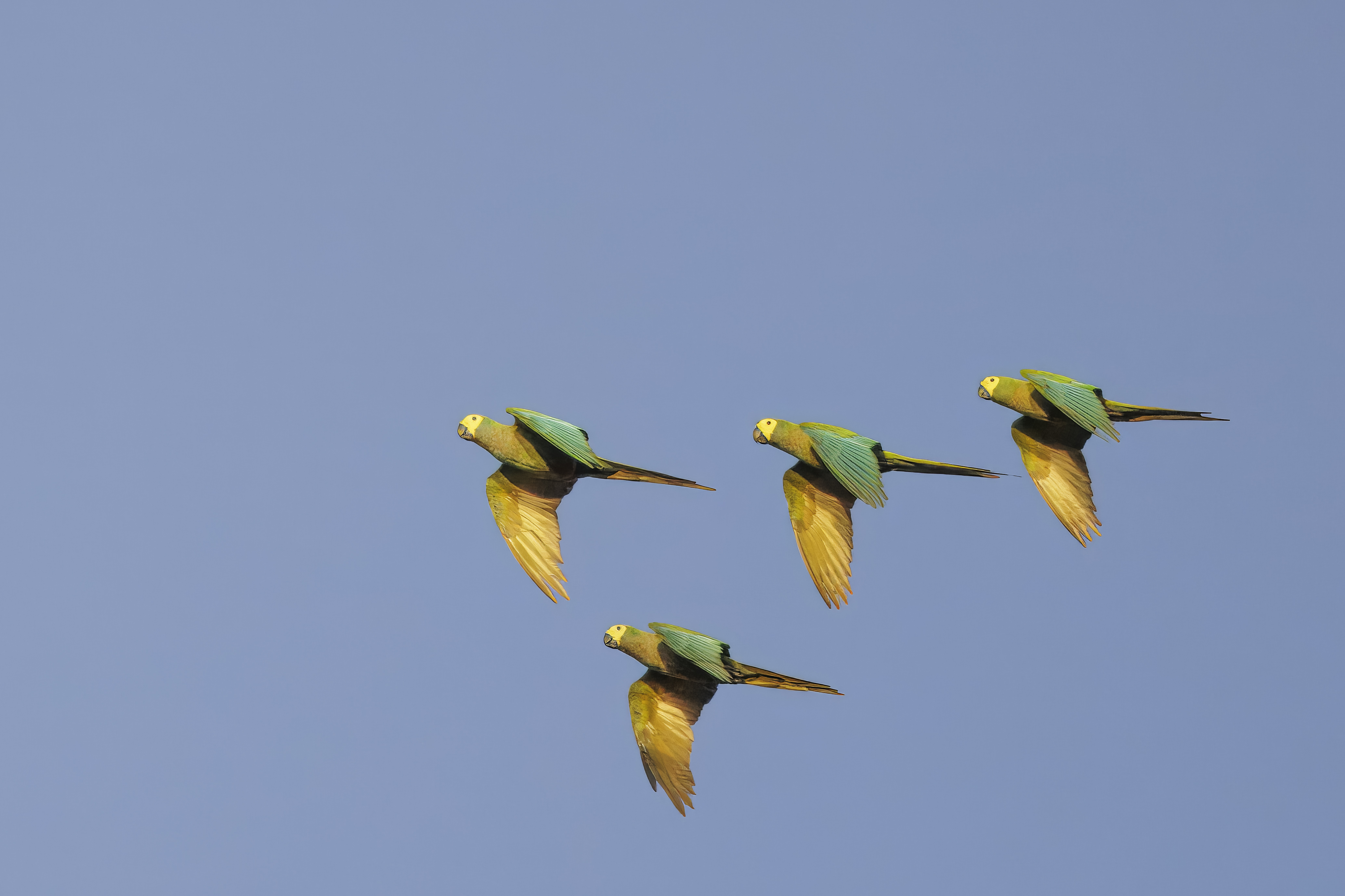
Later afternoon flight

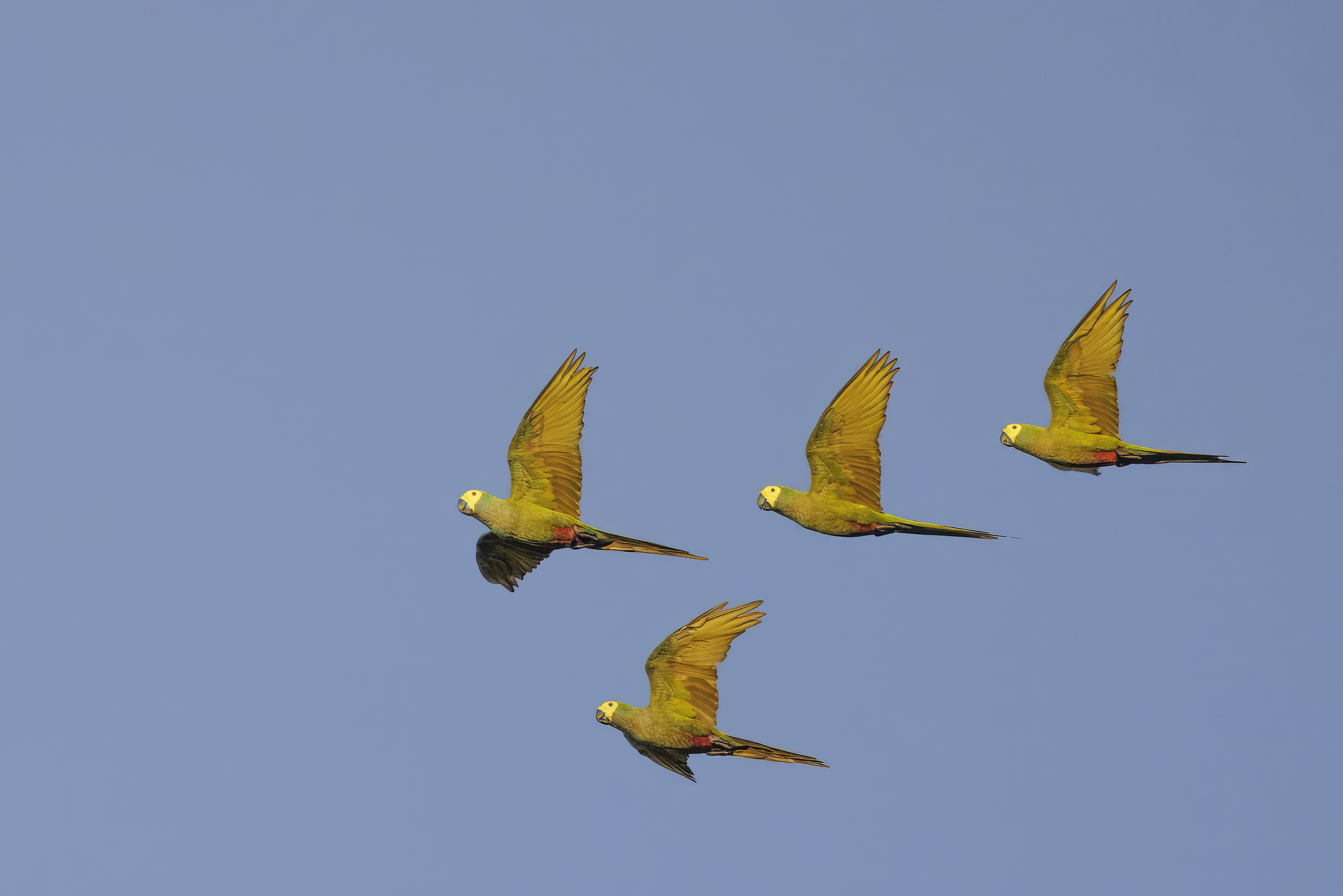
Over Sani Lodge, Rio Napo, Ecuador

== Distribution and habitat ==
The red-bellied macaw has an extremely large range throughout the Amazon Basin of the North Region, Brazil, except in the northwest quadrant centered on a large region of the Rio Negro flowing from Colombia-Venezuela. It ranges through the Guianas including the Guiana Highlands into eastern Venezuela, the lower Orinoco River Basin and across to the island of Trinidad.

Its southern limit in Brazil is the south-central and northwestern cerrado bordering the Amazon Basin.

== Behaviour ==
Red-bellied macaws make reedy, high-pitched screams. They roost communally in the moriche palms, and large numbers can be seen at the roost sites at dawn and dusk; (see crepuscular). They choose large stands of these palms that have an overabundance of woodpecker holes as roosting sites. They sleep communally in these groups of hollows. Depending on the size of the hollow, between five and 10 birds sleep together. As dusk approaches, they all pile into these dormitories and sleep shoulder to shoulder.

=== Breeding ===
Red-bellied macaws nest in cavities of dead moriche palm trees. There are usually two to four white eggs in a clutch. The female incubates the eggs for about 27 days, and the chicks fledge from the nest about 77 days after hatching. Juveniles reach sexual maturity in 2–3 years.

=== Food and feeding ===
Their diet consists almost exclusively of the fruit and seeds of the moriche palm and the Caribbean royal palm (in Trinidad), which are 100% carbohydrate, 0% fat and very high in beta-carotene.

== Conservation status ==
Red-bellied macaws are listed as "least concern" by the IUCN. Population numbers have not been estimated, but wild populations seem to be declining.

== Aviculture ==
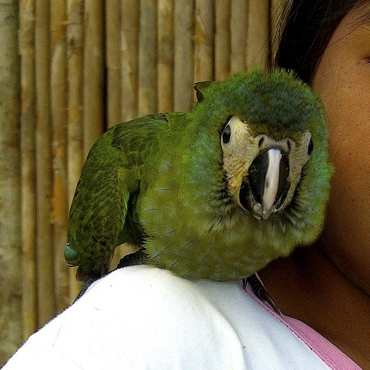
A pet juvenile in Peru

It is extremely difficult keep these birds alive in captivity, because of their high strung personality, and low fat and high carbohydrate diet. Export/Import for the pet trade often results in 100% mortality. Captive-bred chicks have a low survival rate.

The only country to export these birds in recent years is Guyana.

Because of lack of commercial availability of moriche palm nuts, shelled unsalted peanuts have been used as a staple in the diet of captive birds. They should not be fed commercial bird seed, especially fatty seed like sunflower.

The parrot breeder Howard Voren devised feeding and housing methods which would keep wild-caught red-bellied macaws alive in captivity, after observing the parrots' wild behaviors in Guyana. However, he decided to keep his method a secret for many years, as he did not wish to be responsible for restarting the trade in wild-caught macaws from the area, which previous to this had significantly reduced due to the high mortality rates, and therefore lack of commercial viability of trade in the species.

== See also ==
- List of macaws

== Cited texts ==
- Forshaw, Joseph M. (2006). Parrots of the World; an Identification Guide. Illustrated by Frank Knight. Princeton University Press. ISBN 0-691-09251-6.
