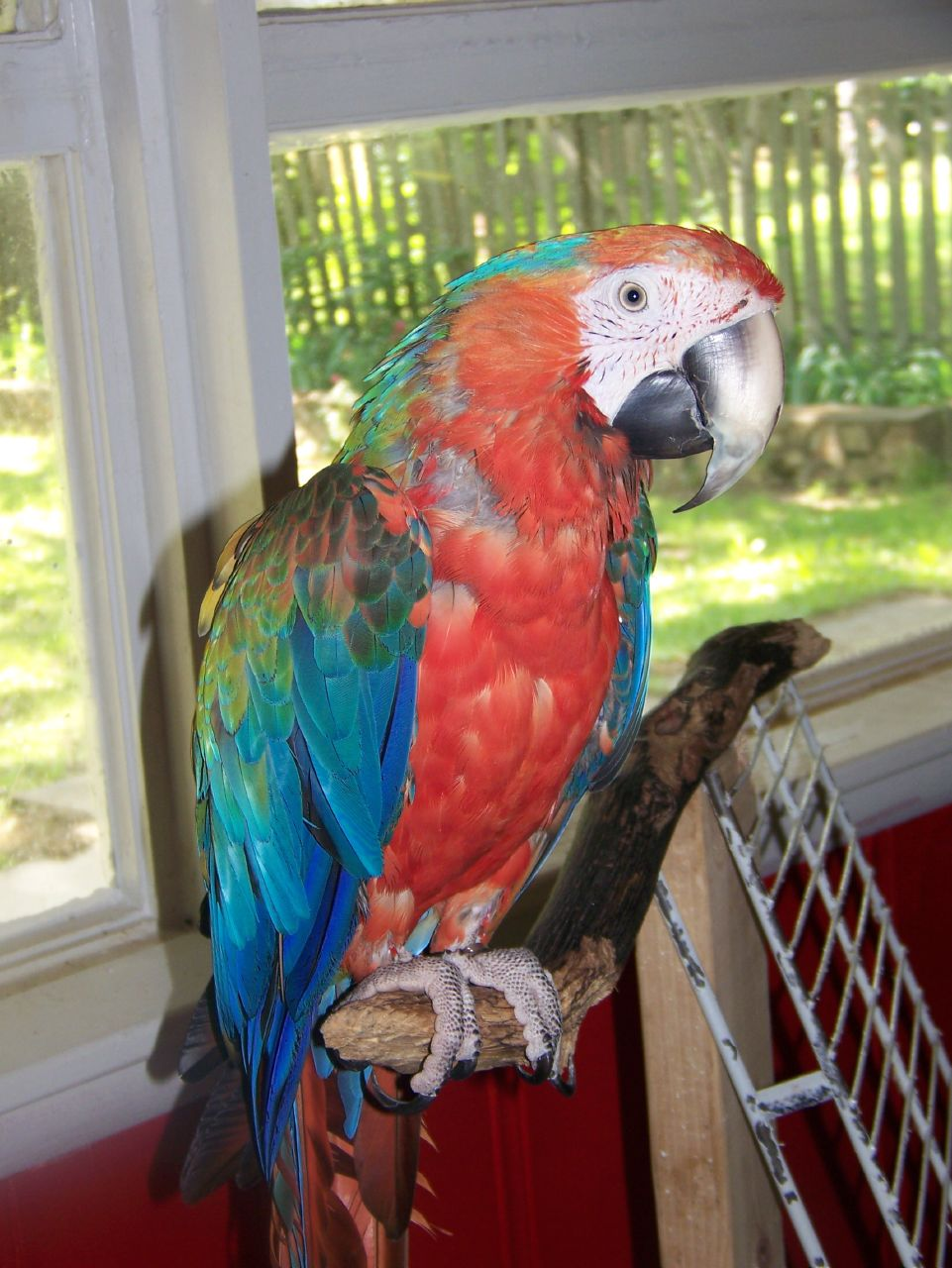

Scientific classification
- Kingdom: Animalia
- Phylum: Chordata
- Class: Aves
- Order: Psittaciformes
- Family: Psittacidae
- Tribe: Arini
- Genus: Ara
- Species: A. ararauna × A. macao

= Catalina macaw =

Hybrid bird

The Catalina macaw, sometimes known as the rainbow macaw is a first generation hybrid between the blue-and-gold macaw and scarlet macaw. As catalina macaws are hybrids, they do not have a true scientific name. The best way to represent these birds in taxonomy is by the expression Ara ararauna × Ara macao.

== Origin ==
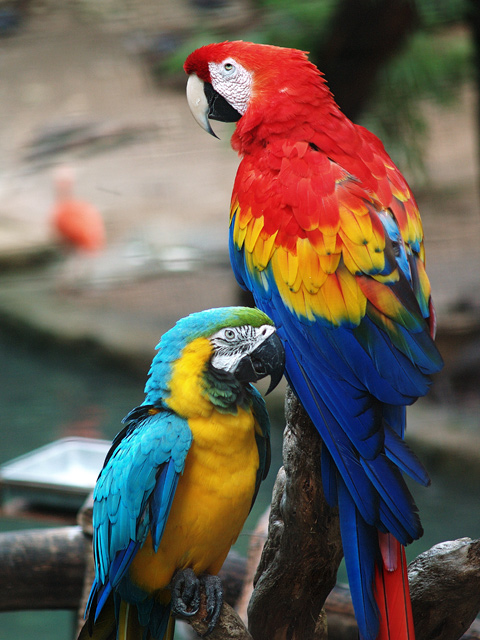
Scarlet macaw (right) and blue-and-gold macaw (left), parents to the Catalina macaw

The Catalina macaw is named after Catalina Bird Park, formerly located on Santa Catalina Island, California, at which this hybrid was first produced in captivity, in 1940. It is a first-generation hybrid between the blue-and-yellow macaw and scarlet macaw. There is speculation that the first hybrid macaw was the Catalina macaw. Hybridization of macaws can occur naturally or in captivity. However, most Catalina macaws are the result of selective breeding. Therefore, they rarely occur in the wild on their own. Breeders have selected the blue-and-gold macaw for its friendly nature, whereas the scarlet macaw is known for its striking beauty. This combination has created the much sought-after Catalina macaw, with its bright coloration and charming personality. In bird breeding, the father's genes are often dominant. Therefore, the male is usually the scarlet macaw, whereas the female is the blue-and-gold macaw. It is also possible to produce a second-generation hybrid by breeding two Catalina macaws together.

== Description ==
Catalina macaws generally weigh 2–3 pounds (0.9–1.4 kg) and can reach up to 35 inches (89 cm) in length from the beak to the tip of the tail feathers. Their wingspan reaches 40–45 inches (100–110 cm). The average Catalina lives up to 60 years in captivity. The chest, abdomen, and back are usually orange or yellowish with greens and blues on the wings, with the coloration most strongly influenced by the father's genes. They have a white chin with black patches around it, and their beak is usually gray. They are physically similar to Harlequin macaws but have a long tapering tail. Their bright coloration is due to pigments and structural colors in the feathers. Psittacofulvins are the pigment responsible for the bright red, orange, and yellow colors. Therefore, the coloration of the feathers can be an indicator of their overall health. However, blues and greens are not produced by any pigment. Instead, the color blue observed on the Catalina (as well as all birds) is a structural color, whereas the green coloration found in Catalinas is produced by a combination of blue structural colors and yellow pigments.

== Behavior ==
=== Vocalizations ===
Like most macaws, the Catalina macaw can learn words and phrases over its lifetime. Although less impressive talkers than some other parrots, this bird can say up to 15 words or expressions. They are also highly vocal birds and will get loud and scream if they are excited, bored, or trying to communicate. The Catalina macaw is loud because it is very social and likes to interact with people and other birds. Their screams have been registered to reach 100–106 decibels, comparable to a live rock concert or a jackhammer.

Macaws live in flocks in the wild. In the absence of a flock, the Catalina macaw recognizes its caregivers as the flock. It will try to communicate with its caregiver like it would communicate with its flock in the wild. Therefore, captive macaws will often use "contact calls" if left alone. Wild macaws do this to reconnect with the rest of the flock if they are lost or alone. These yells progressively become louder in captive Catalina macaw with long periods of separation. Therefore, Catalina macaws are not recommended for people who live in apartment buildings or are frequently away.

=== Diet ===
The Catalina macaw has the same diet as most macaws. Since macaws are active birds, they need lots of food rich in oils and calories to meet their needs. A balanced diet includes a variety of seeds, plants, fruits, and nuts. Furthermore, it is possible to purchase good parrot mix from pet stores. However, these mixes are best used if also complemented with fresh fruits and vegetables. Fruits that are good to feed include apples, pears, plums, cherries, grapes, bananas, mangoes, papayas, and berries. Vegetables that are good to feed include carrots, sweet potatoes, cucumbers, zucchini, and leafy greens.

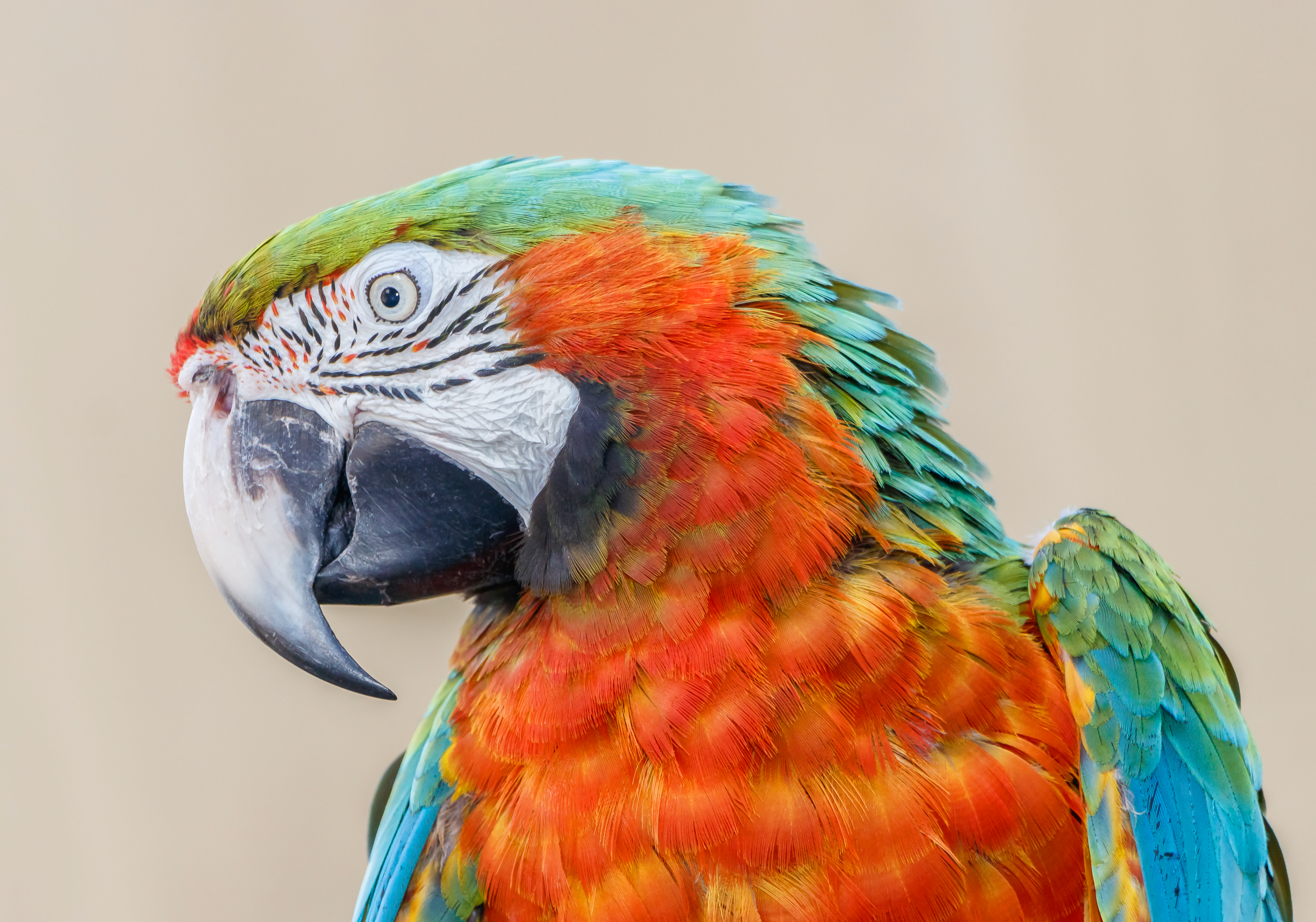
Catalina macaw

=== Reproduction ===
The first reports of macaw hybrids date back to the early 20th century. Today, it is common practice for hybrid macaws to be bred in captivity. All macaws are sexually monomorphic, making it difficult to distinguish a male from a female without genetic testing. Therefore, breeders must first ensure they pair a female blue-and-gold macaw with a male scarlet macaw to produce the Catalina macaw. Furthermore, these macaws need to develop a bond with each other before mating. The bonded pair receives a nest box in which they will lay 2–3 eggs. The incubation period lasts around 28 days. The ideal breeding ages for macaws range from 4–8 years old, but the largest macaws have been known to reproduce at 30–35 years old.

The Catalina is considered a first-generation hybrid. However, since the Catalina macaw has many desirable traits, bird breeders have crossed it with other macaws to create additional macaw hybrids. These second-generation hybrids include:

- Catablu macaw (Catalina macaw × blue and gold macaw)
- Camelina macaw (Catalina macaw × Camelot macaw)
- Camelot macaw (Catalina macaw × scarlet macaw)
- Flame macaw (Catalina macaw × green-wing macaw)
- Hyalina macaw (Catalina macaw × hyacinth macaw)
- Maui sunrise macaw (Catalina macaw × harlequin macaw)
- Milicat macaw (Catalina macaw × miligold macaw)
- Militalina macaw (Catalina macaw × military macaw)
- Rubalina macaw (Catalina macaw × ruby macaw)
- Shamalina macaw (Catalina macaw × shamrock macaw)

== Diseases ==
Like most macaws, the Catalina macaw is susceptible to various health problems:

- Avian bornaviral ganglioneuritis (AVD)
- Allergies
- Beak malformations
- Miscellaneous infections: bacterial, viral, or fungal diseases
- Psittacosis (also known as chlamydiosis or parrot fever)
- Toxicity
- Kidney disease
- Psittacine beak and feather disease (PBFD)
- Cloacal papillomas

Visible signs of an illness can include weight loss, behavioral changes, excessive saliva, feathers bulges, weaknesses, respiratory symptoms, ruffled plumage, diarrhea, partially close or watery eyes. The manifestation of illness differs from bird to bird. Furthermore, the coloration of the feathers can indicate the general health of the bird. In sick Catalina macaws, it has been observed that their bright feathers become dull, and it has even been reported that the green feathers can turn yellow in signs of illness. Symptoms differ depending on the disease.

Some diseases worth mentioning include Psittacosis and Avian Ganglioneuritis. Psittacosis is a disease that can affect birds and humans. In humans, psittacosis can manifest itself to different degrees that range from asymptomatic state, mild flu-like symptoms to severe symptoms (myocarditis, hepatitis, respiratory distress syndrome, organ failure). Therefore, new birds should be screened for psittacosis or quarantined before being introduced to other birds. Another common disease found in nearly one-third of the avian population is the Avian Bornavirus (ABV). ABV impacts the nervous system and causes gastrointestinal and neurological dysfunction. It is often fatal if left untreated.

== Training ==
Catalina macaws, like most macaws, need to be trained to become good pets. There are a few rules of thumb for training macaws. First, training should never lead to physical or emotional abuse towards the bird. Similarly, training sessions need to be complemented with positive reinforcement and never negative reinforcement. Successful training should be enjoyable for the bird but not overwhelming. Generally, training sessions should not be longer than 20 minutes. Taking day-long breaks between each session might result in the macaw forgetting the progress. Furthermore, macaws are food motivated, which makes treats an excellent learning tool.

=== Speaking ===
Macaws can learn phrases and words. The teaching process is not complicated. First, the caregiver must grab the birds' attention and say the word. With repetition over time, the macaw will memorize and repeat the word. The learning process generally takes around one week per word. Once the bird has learned the word, it will forever be in its vocabulary. Macaws associate certain words with the pitch. Therefore, the word should always be pronounced using the same pitch, or it might confuse the bird. Finally, it is not recommended to use a voice recorder since this might stress the bird out. Instead, patience and repetition are key.

=== Socializing ===
Socialization is vital for macaws to understand acceptable ways of interacting with their human flock. Properly socialized macaws are confident, active, playful, and outgoing. Poorly socialized macaws might show signs of aggressiveness, feather picking, and neediness. Socialization can be done by providing safe opportunities for the bird to explore its environment, play with different toys, meet new people and other birds, and taste new foods. Socialization paired with training is the stepping stone to raising a happy and well-rounded Catalina macaw.

=== Behavioral training ===
Untrained macaws can present numerous challenges for their owners. These include behaviors that are not favorable, such as lunging, biting, and excessive chewing. Lunging occurs when macaws lunge towards people, and their immediate response is to back away. The macaw then thinks that it can control humans with threat behaviors. Similarly, macaws can use their beaks to bite. Although this behavior might indicate that something is wrong, it can also develop into an undesirable behavior over time. Furthermore, macaws like to chew and destroy items. If they are untrained, this can lead to excessive chewing and become a potential hazard for both the bird and the owner. These undesirable behaviors can be avoided with patience and adequate training.
