= Catalina Bird Park =

Aviary on Catalina Island, California (1926–1966)

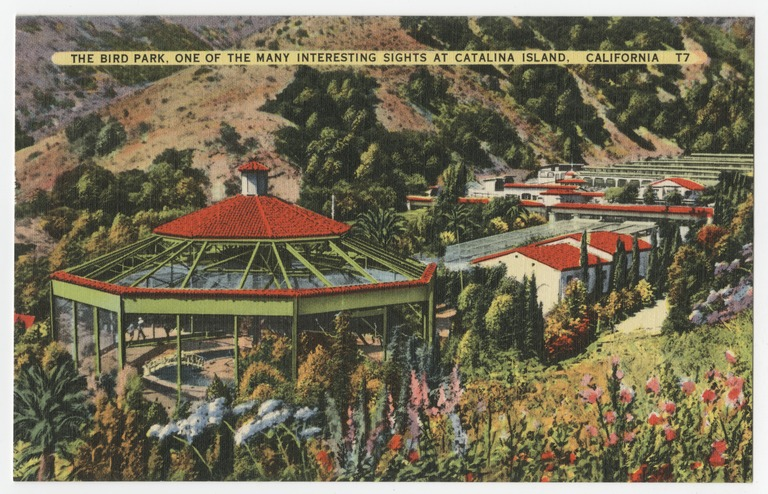
- Tichnor Brothers postcard, UCSD Library
- Interactive map of Catalina Bird Park
- 33.3353°N 118.3327°W
- Date opened: 1926
- Date closed: 1966
- Location: Santa Catalina Island, California

Catalina Bird Park, or Wrigley Bird Park, was a 20th-century collection of exotic birds and game fowl kept on Santa Catalina Island, California, United States, under the sponsorship of the island's owner William Wrigley Jr. The Bird Park was located in Avalon Canyon along the Avalon municipal boundary.

== History ==
The Bird Park opened in approximately 1926. The Bird Park was meant to be an enticement to visit the island generally and did not produce any revenue. The steel girders from the original dance hall—the one that was replaced by the Catalina Casino—were reused in the construction of the Bird Park aviary in 1928. The resulting cage was 90 ft (27 m) in diameter and 115 ft (35 m) high. Former President and Mrs. Calvin Coolidge paid a visit in 1930. Circa 1931, the aviary was open to tourists, admission was free, and there were more than 5,000 individual birds in the collection. Circa 1934, Out West magazine reported that golden and ring-neck pheasants that had "been liberated" from the Bird Park were adapting well to canyons of the island.

The first supervisor of the aviary, which had a breeding program, was Edward Herbert Lewis. Lewis also designed the park, supervised construction, selected the exhibits, and trained the talking mynahs. Les Mobley was superintendent in 1951 when the bird park successfully hatched and displayed three baby emus. The Catalina macaw, a hybrid macaw which takes its name from the park and is now popular as a pet was first bred in captivity at Catalina Bird Park in 1940. When the Catalina Bird Park aviary closed in 1966, the newly established Los Angeles Zoo purchased the remaining 650 birds for US$14,000 (equivalent to about $138,920 in 2025).

The physical plant was described as being Moorish styled in design and spread over 7.5 acres (3.0 ha). The Bird Park was decorated with Catalina art tiles including several "bird murals" of toucans, macaws, crested cranes, etc. The tiled fountain from the Bird Park was moved to Avalon Plaza after the aviary was shut down. The Bird Park was adjacent to the Catalina Island Golf Course. Some of the bird park structures have been converted into subsidized housing.

== Additional images ==
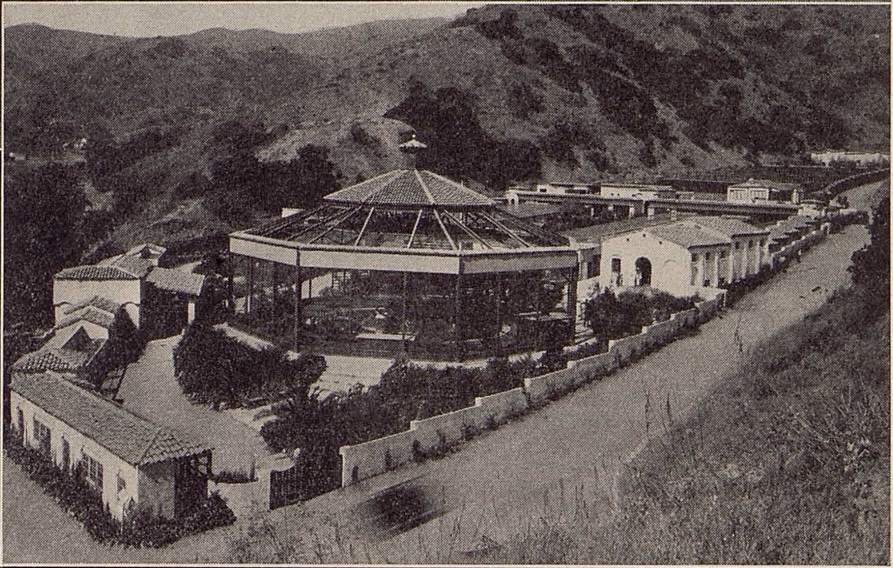
Catalina Bird Park, an attraction of the Southland that could reached via the San Pedro via Dominguez Line (Pacific Electric magazine July–August 1932)

"Bird Park Apartments on Santa Catalina Island, a rocky island off the coast of California" (Carol Highsmith, 2013)

== See also ==
- Catalina macaw
- Catalina Island bison herd
- History of Santa Catalina Island § Wrigley ownership (1919–1975)
- Feather Hill Zoo – Animal collection, Santa Barbara, California (1924–1930)
- Universal City Zoo – Animal collection in California (1913–1930)
- Selig Zoo – Animal collection in Los Angeles (~1911–~1940)
