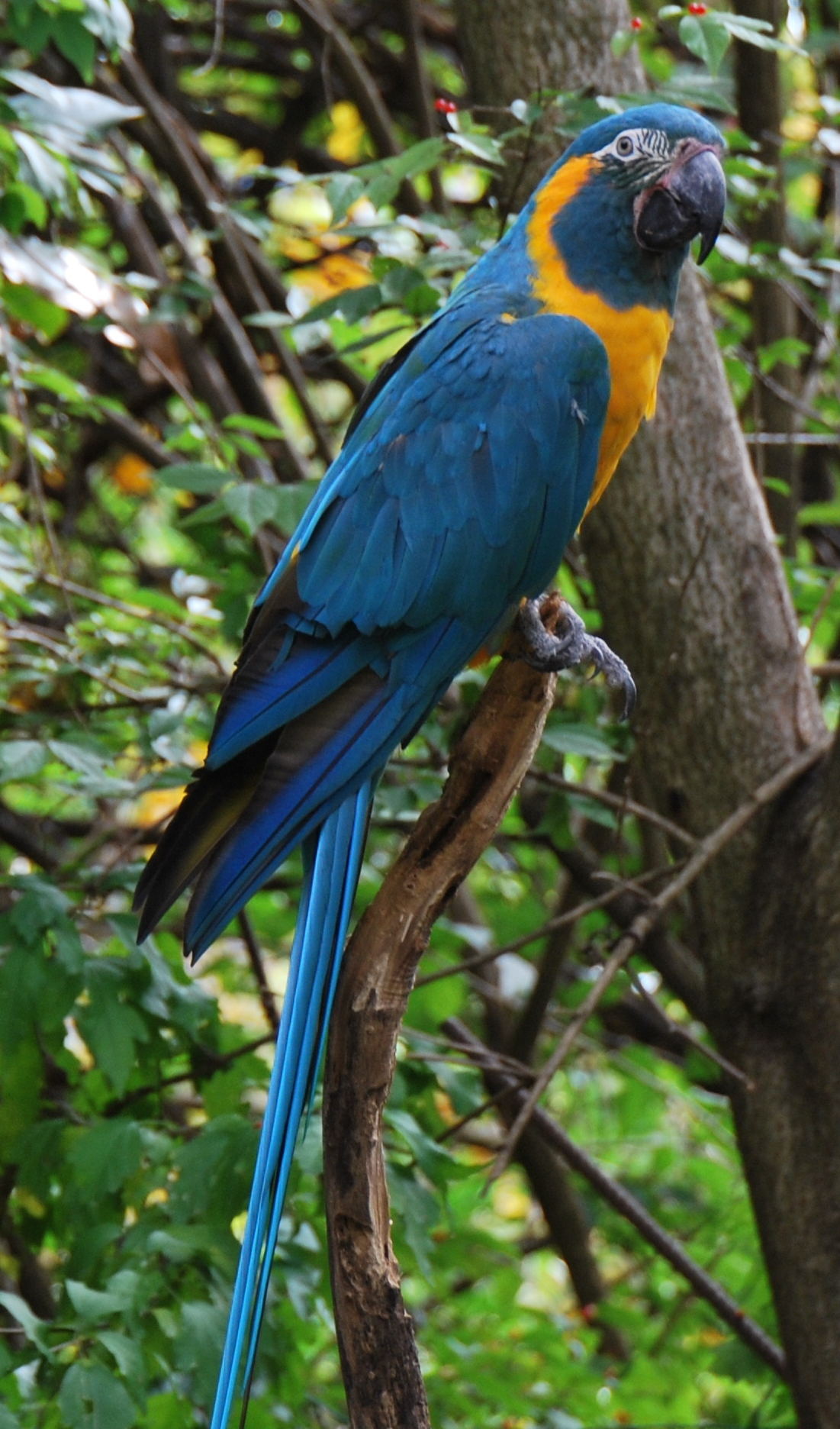
- At Cincinnati Zoo and Botanical Garden, Ohio, US

Conservation status
- Critically Endangered (IUCN 3.1)
- CITES Appendix I

Scientific classification
- Kingdom: Animalia
- Phylum: Chordata
- Class: Aves
- Order: Psittaciformes
- Family: Psittacidae
- Genus: Ara
- Species: A. glaucogularis

Binomial name
- Ara glaucogularis Dabbene, 1921
- Distribution range

Synonyms
- Ara caninde; Ara ararauna caninde

= Blue-throated macaw =

Species of bird from Bolivia

The blue-throated macaw (Ara glaucogularis), also known as the Caninde macaw or Wagler's macaw, is a macaw endemic to a small area of north-central Bolivia, known as Los Llanos de Moxos. In 2014 this species was designated by law as a natural patrimony of Bolivia. Until 2010, it was hunted by native people to make feathered "Moxeño" headdresses for "machetero" ritual dances.

Recent population and range estimates suggest that about 208–303 adult individuals remain in the wild. Its demise was brought upon by nesting competition, avian predation, and a small native range, exacerbated by indigenous hunting and capture for the pet trade. Current threats continue to include hunting and trapping as well as tree cutting, invasive species, disease, and use of powders or foams used to extinguish fires. It is listed as Critically Endangered by the IUCN in the wild and is protected by trading prohibitions.

The name "Wagler's macaw" is in honor of German herpetologist and ornithologist Johann Georg Wagler, who processed many of Johan Baptist von Spix's Brazilian collections at LMU Munich, and first described the blue macaws for a European readership in Monographia Psittacorum (1832).

== Taxonomy ==
Ara is from a Tupi Indian word for macaw; glauco (glaucous Latin for greyish-blue or green) + gularis (Latin: throat). The blue-throated macaw is one of 8 extant species (and a few extinct species) in genus Ara of large long-tailed parrots collectively called macaws. The genus Ara is one of six genera of Central and South American macaws in the tribe Arini, which also includes all the other long-tailed New World parrots. Tribe Arini together with the short-tailed Amazon and allied parrots and a few miscellaneous genera make up subfamily Arinae of Neotropical parrots in family Psittacidae of true parrots.

The blue-throated macaw was originally thought to be a subspecies (Ara ararauna caninde) of the similar-looking blue-and-yellow macaw.

== Description ==
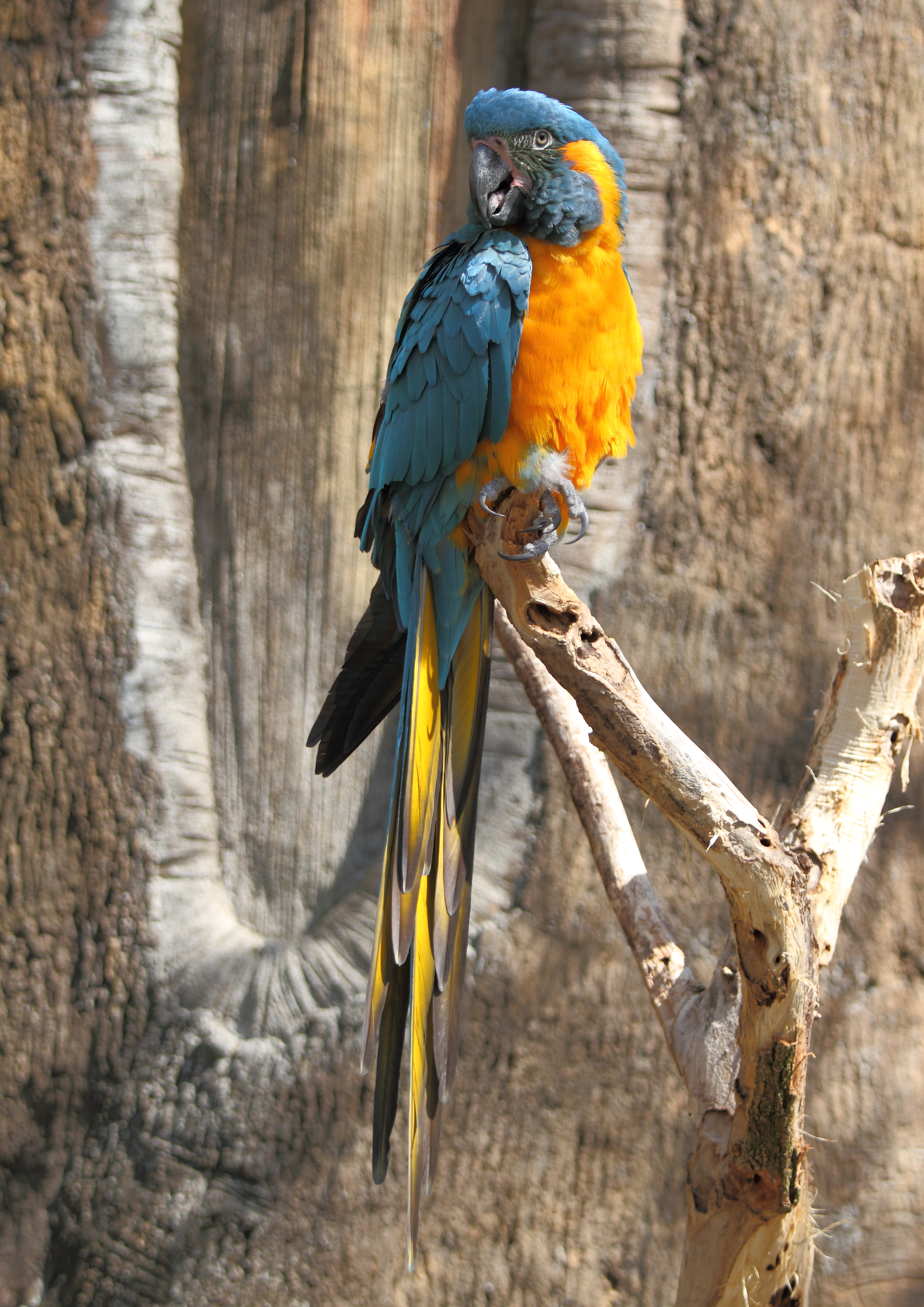
Blue-throated macaw raised in captivity. Photographed at Cincinnati Zoo, Cincinnati, Ohio

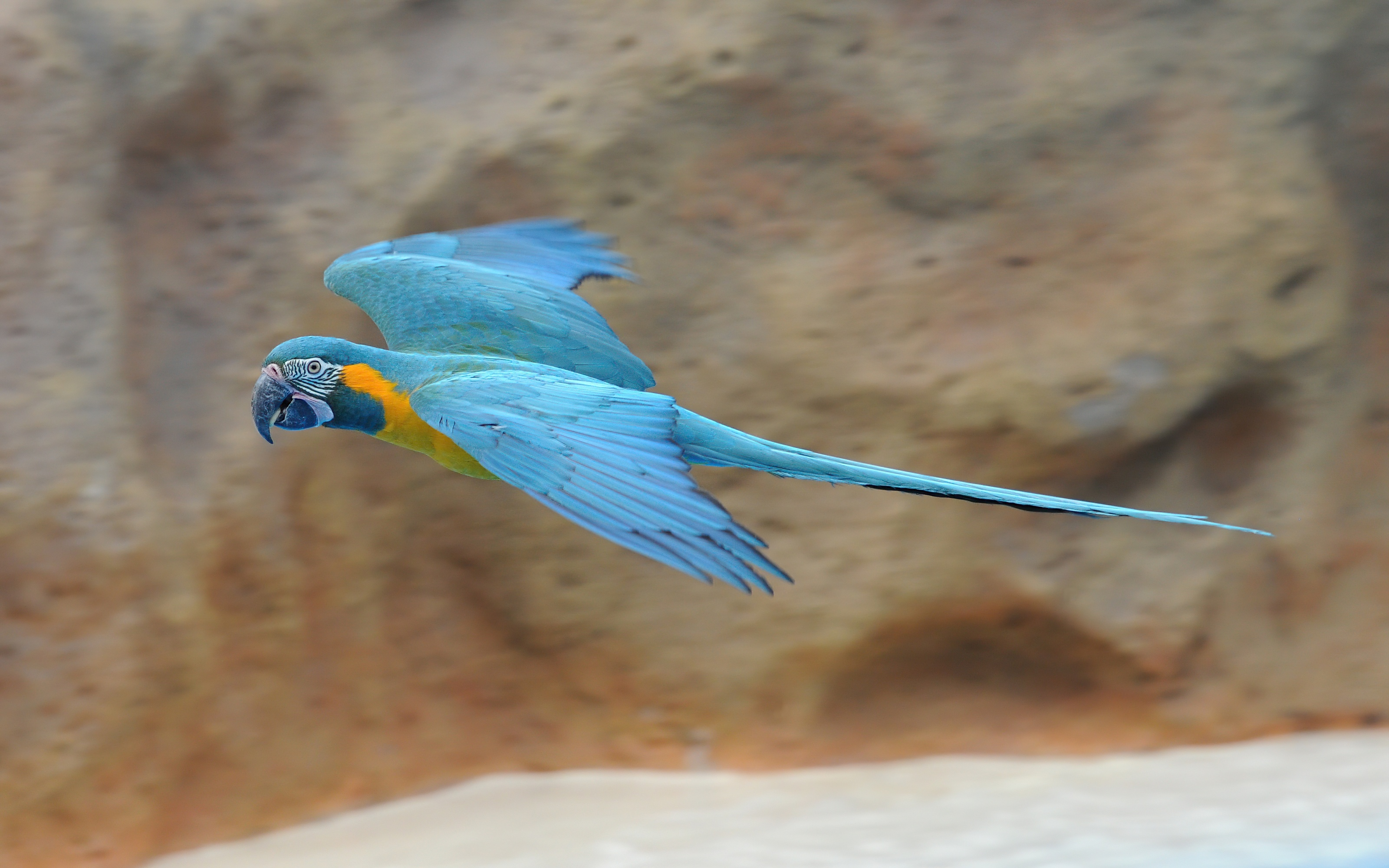
Blue-throated macaw in flight

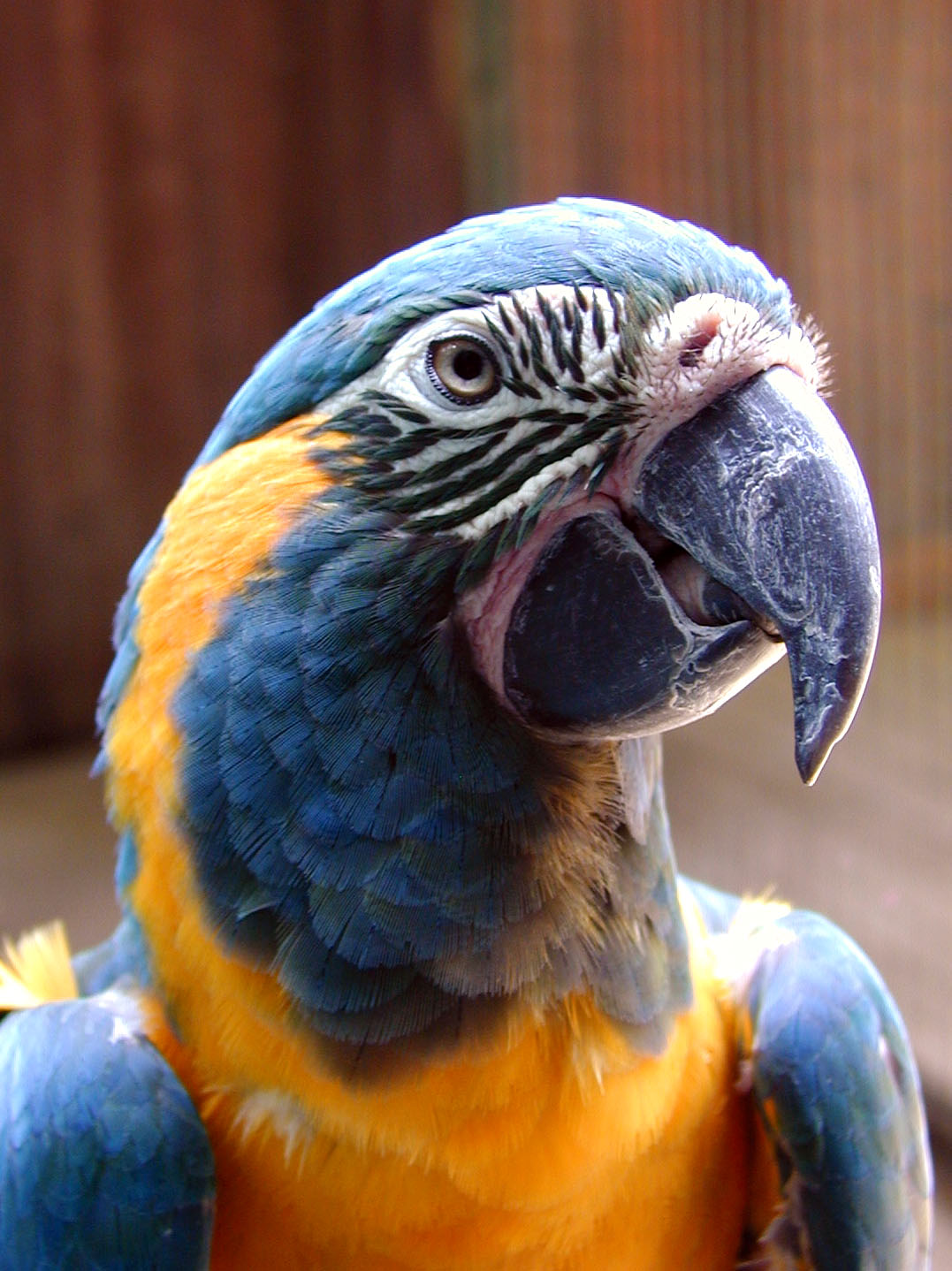
Close-up of head

The blue-throated macaw is about 85 cm (33 in) long including the length of its tail feathers and has a wingspan of approximately three feet or 90 cm. It weighs about 900 g (32 oz) to 1,100 g (39 oz). There is little easily observable sexual dimorphism; however, males tend to be a little bigger than females with approximate masses of 750 g and 950 g respectively. Upperparts are turquoise-blue, slightly duller on crown and brighter on rump. Underparts largely bright yellow but the vent is pale blue. It has a bare facial patch obscured by blue feather-lines merging into a blue lower cheek and throat, separated from its crown by a narrow yellow stripe and bare pink skin around base of the large, black bill. On the face there is a sparsely feathered patch of skin near the base of the large dark-colored bill that has 5 or 6 horizontal stripes of blue feathers which are unique for every blue-throated macaw and can be used to individually identify adults.

The adults have yellow irises and the juveniles have brown irises. The eye color of a nestling is initially black and changes to brown soon after the eyes open. Between one and three years old, the eyes will turn grey, then white. As the macaw matures, the iris turns yellow and the amount of gold increases with age after 10 years. Elderly macaws show a ring of dark grey surrounding the pupil where the iris has become thinner and the back of the retina shows through. It can be separated from the slightly larger blue-and-yellow macaw by the blue (not black) throat, the blue (not green) crown and the lack of contrast between the remiges and upperwing coverts.

== Distribution and habitat ==
The blue-throated macaw lives in the Llanos de Moxos of the Beni Department of Bolivia, nesting in "Islas" (islands) of palm trees that dot the level plains. It is not a forest-dwelling bird. This species is one of the rarest in the world. There are two areas inhabited by two sub-populations of Ara glaucogularis: one is to the northwest of Trinidad (the capital city of Beni), and the other is to the south of Trinidad. This complex landscape consists of grasslands, marshes, forest islands, and corridors of forests along waterways. They occur most often between the elevations of 200 and 300 m (660 and 980 ft).

== Behaviour ==
Blue-throated macaws are most frequently found in monogamous pairs, but small groups of 7–9 do occur and one large roosting group of 70 is known. It is not known if these macaws will pair with another mate if their original mate dies. Their main mode of locomotion is flying, but they are also able to climb trees, maneuver along branches and walk on the ground. These birds are active during the day and usually stay in one general area. Blue-throated macaws communicate mostly by sound. When they suspect danger, they emit a very loud alarming call and promptly fly off. Blue-throated macaws are known to communicate with each other with quiet caws as well.

=== Feeding ===
Blue-throated macaws do not eat seeds and nuts to the same extent as many other macaw species do. Instead, they primarily eat fruit from large palms. The palm species Attalea phalerata is the most predominant source, but they will also eat from Acrocomia aculeata and Mauritia flexuosa. The macaws eat the mesocarp from ripe and nearly ripe fruit and have also been observed drinking the liquid from very immature fruit.

=== Breeding ===
Blue-throated macaws usually breed once a year but if the eggs or nestlings are lost, they may produce a second clutch in the same breeding season. A clutch consists of one to three eggs and incubates for 26 days. Nestlings have a mass of approximately 18 g (0.63 oz) at hatching and fledge at 13 to 14 weeks. The young macaws are still fully dependent upon their parents for food after they fledge until they are capable of foraging by themselves. Even after this occurs, it has been observed that young blue-throated macaws will stay with their parents up to a year. During this time, the parents will skip an entire breeding season. Blue-throated macaws reach sexual maturity at about 5 years of age.

=== Nesting ===
Blue-throated macaws usually nest in cavities of palm trees, most often Attalea phalerata, although it will nest in other palm species as well. Dead palms are the preferred nest as they are hollowed out by large grubs after the tree has died. Nesting pairs of blue-throated macaws do not consistently stay at one nest for consecutive breeding seasons and will usually search for different nesting sites every year. In the wild the blue-throated macaw often compete for nesting-holes in trees with the blue-and-yellow macaw, green-winged macaw, scarlet macaw, woodpeckers, toco toucans, barn owls, bats, and bees. The number of suitable nest trees has been in decline due to the large amounts of deforestation in its natural habitat.

== Conservation status and programs ==
The blue-throated macaw has a very small population and is on the verge of extinction in the wild. It is listed on the IUCN Red List as critically endangered. It is also listed in Appendix I by CITES. Trapping is illegal as blue-throated macaws have been protected by the national legislation of Bolivia. According to locals the wild population of the blue-throated macaw in the 1980s was thought to number 500–1000 individuals. Although trapping ceased later in the 1990s, the wild population remains low, with previous estimates of between 110 and 130 individuals, that more recently have been increased to about 350–400 after surveys by Armonia Association and the Loro Parque Fundacion found additional birds. The World Parrot Trust has many volunteers and employees working to monitor the nests to protect the chicks from predation. Chicks are also examined periodically to ensure that they are healthy and receiving adequate food from their parents. If necessary, the chick is supplemented with formula. Nest boxes have been built, current nest sites improved, and support from the local landowners has been established. In 2008, American Bird Conservancy partnered with the World Land Trust-US, Loro Parque Fundacion, and Assiociacion Armonia to create the blue-throated macaw Reserve. In 2010, the reserve was expanded by 2,800 acres (formerly Juvena Ranch) and is now 11,500 acres.

Armonia has also created a program in recent years to replace the real feathers in traditional indigenous 'machetero' headdresses with artificial feathers created from hand-painted palm fronds. The feathers for the headdresses were previously culled from several species of macaw, including the Blue-throated, and as many as 10 birds were killed to make one head-piece.

== Endangered Species Act ==
On November 4, 2013, the blue-throated macaw was listed under the Endangered Species Act, per the USFWS Final rule. Because of their large captive population, the American Federation of Aviculture asked that captive-born blue-throated macaws not be listed through a 19-page submission to the federal government.

== Aviculture ==
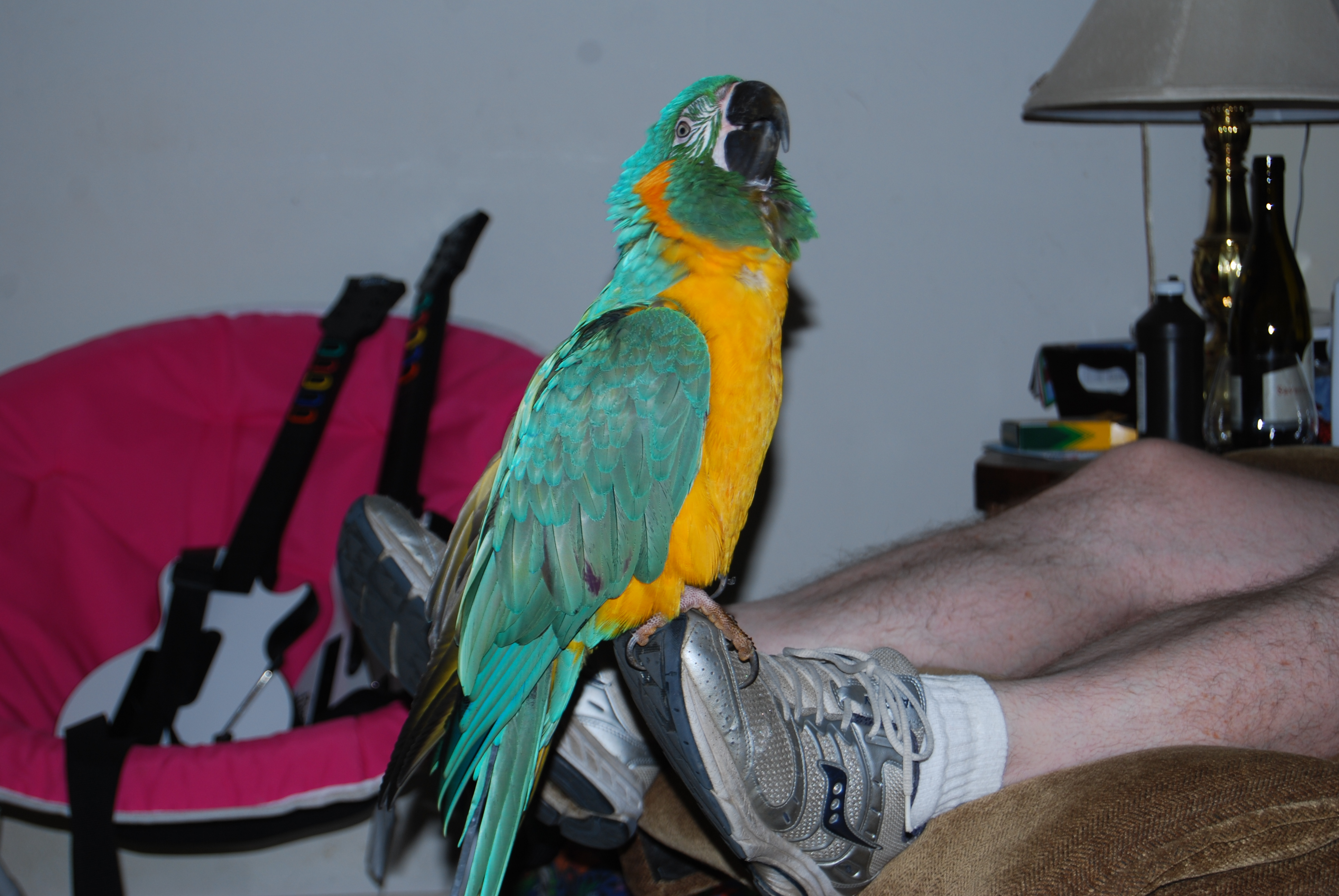
A pet blue-throated macaw

They are relatively easy to find in captivity, and the captive population consists of about 1000–1100 individuals. Individuals are kept in several zoos around the world, among them the Santa Cruz zoo in Bolivia. Captive blue-throated macaws have successfully hybridized with the military macaw, producing offspring known by aviculturists as Corrientes macaws.

Several breeding and conservation schemes in zoos have now been set up to save this species. Other projects have been started to protect the remaining wild population, but at present, numbers are still decreasing.

In the wild, within the palm groves of Bolivia, birds nest in tree hollows created in dead palm trunks, rotten knot-holes and dead limbs of trees. There is some evidence that parents maintain the third chick of a clutch with minimal food as an insurance against the loss of the older dominant chicks. If disaster should befall the larger chick, the parent can switch to feeding the youngest, and it will exhibit a constant growth curve from the day of active feeding. It is this physiological response that enables researchers to raise the third chick of a clutch in captivity and then return them to the wild nests when they are nearing fledge.

Blue-throated macaws are early nesters and utilize these rare resources of nest holes before the other macaws are in breeding condition.

The blue-throated macaw is sometimes, albeit uncommonly kept as a pet companion parrot. When tame, it tends to be an outgoing, docile and affectionate bird, even cuddly with humans in some circumstances. An intelligent bird; like most parrots, it requires several hours outside its cage every day and regular social interaction with humans or other birds in order to remain healthy, although it is sometimes known to bully other birds kept alongside it. The species is known for its predilection for damaging and disassembling its keeper's property, as well as opening and escaping from its cage if left unsupervised. It may be less noisy than other large macaw species and while it is not known for its talking ability, it may learn to mimic a few words. The World Parrot Trust recommends that the blue-throated macaw be kept in an enclosure of 15 metres in length and that this species should not be kept indoors permanently. It may live for over 50 years in captivity.

== Plumage details ==
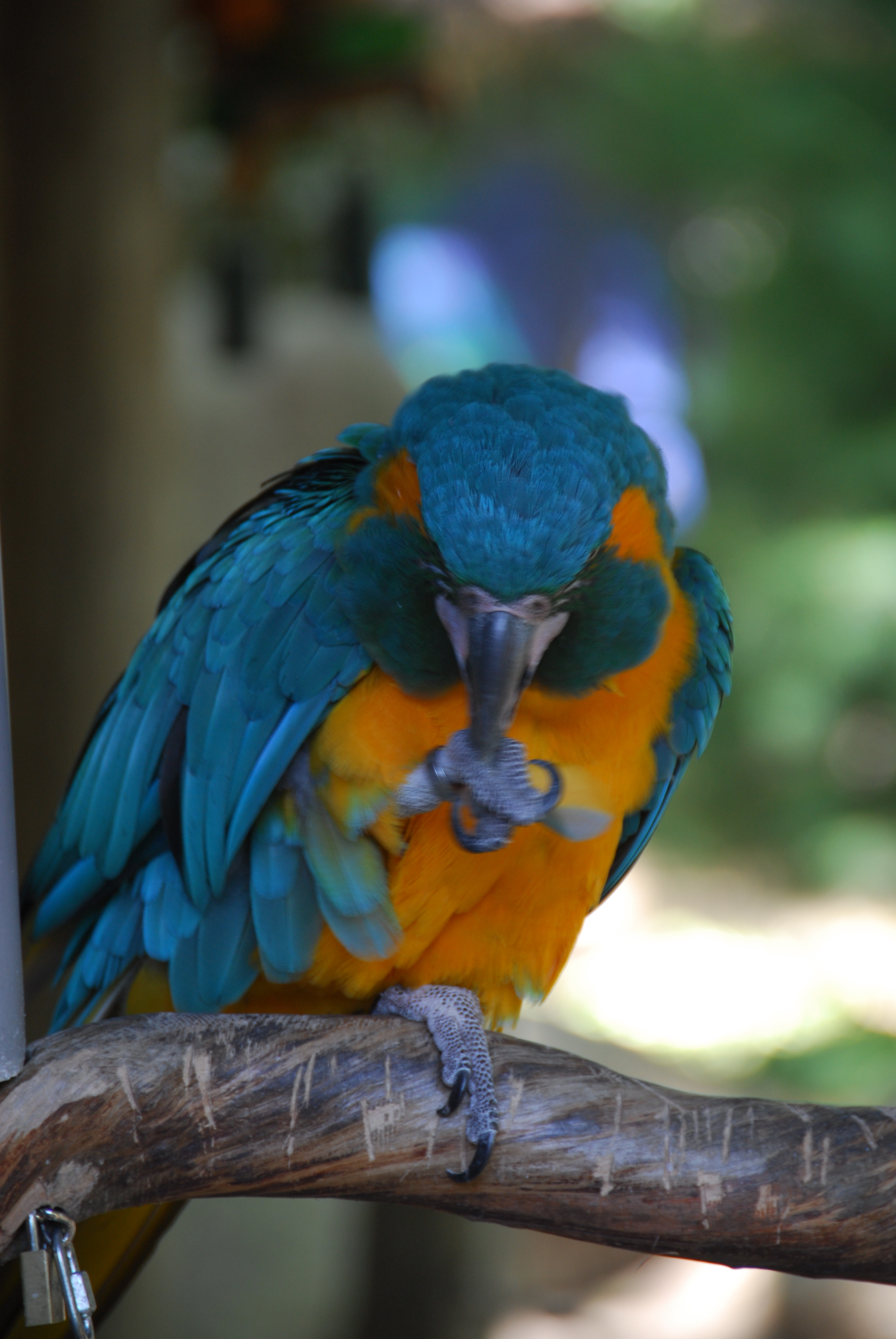
Top of head is blue.

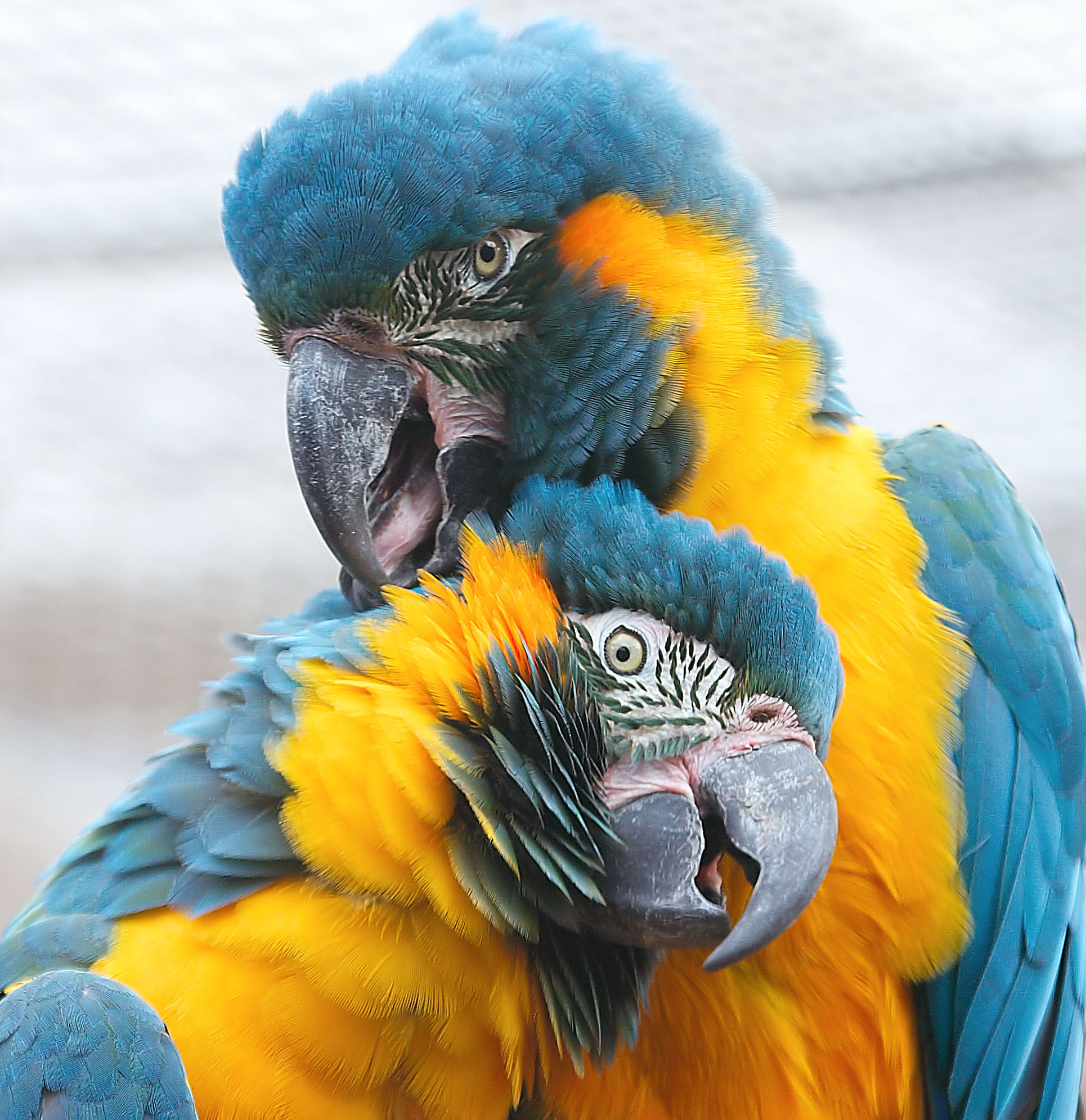
Upper body

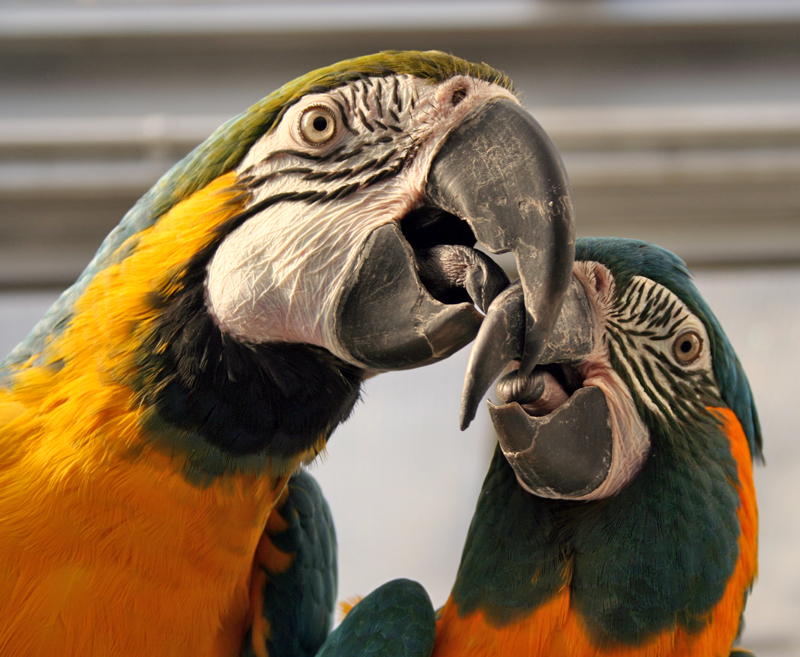
Blue-and-yellow macaw (left) and blue-throated macaw (right)
