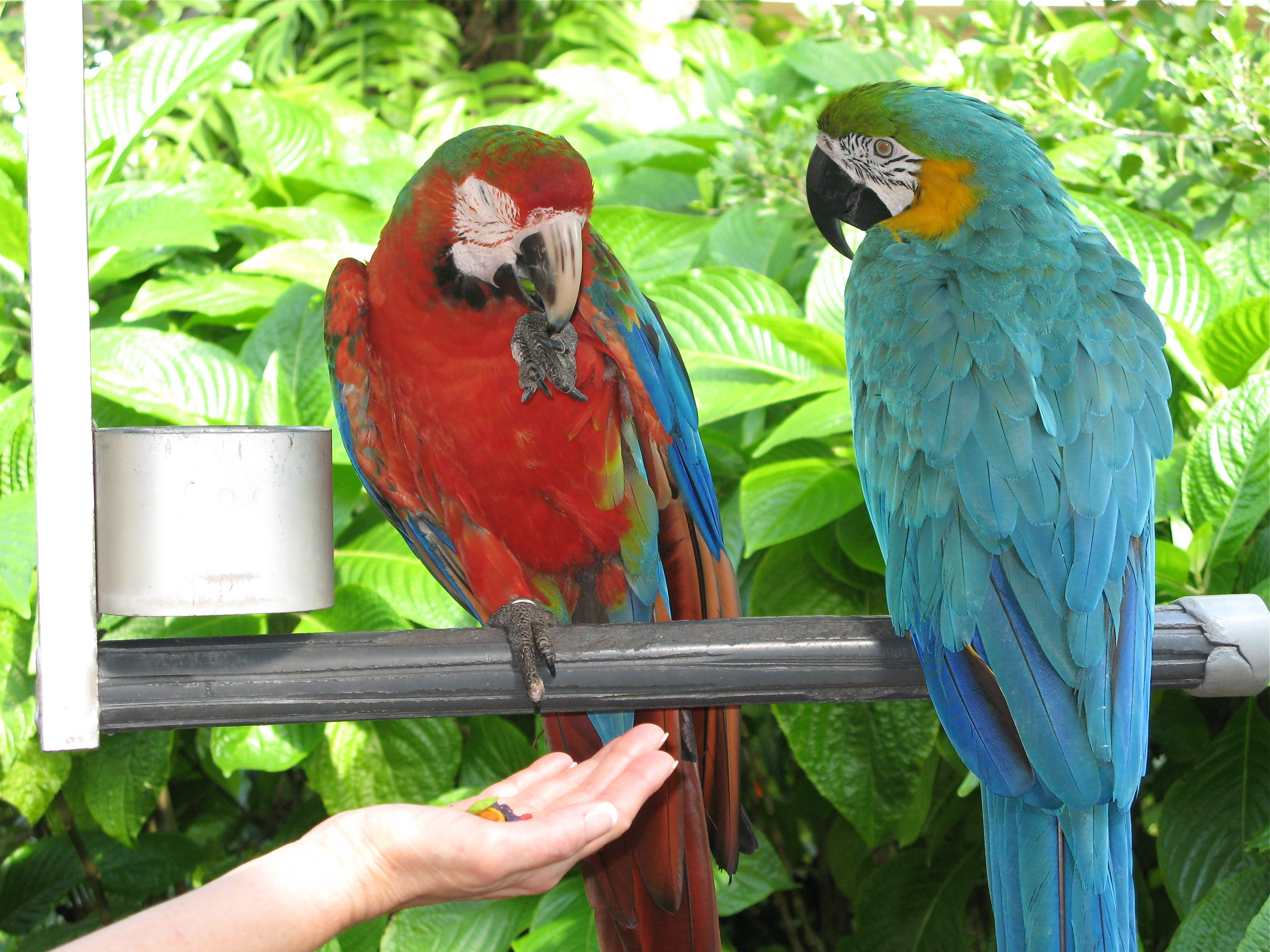
- Hybrid macaw (left) with blue-and-gold macaw

Scientific classification
- Kingdom: Animalia
- Phylum: Chordata
- Class: Aves
- Order: Psittaciformes
- Family: Psittacidae
- Subfamily: Arinae
- Tribe: Arini

Genera
- Ara; Anodorhynchus; Cyanopsitta; Primolius; Orthopsittaca; Diopsittaca

= Hybrid macaw =

Crossbred bird

Hybrid macaws are the product of cross breeding of more than one species of macaw, resulting in a hybrid. They are often characterized and bred for their unique and distinct coloring, and for this reason, are highly sought after and valued in the exotic pet trade. Macaws are native to tropical North and South America. Hybridization of macaws occurs both in nature and captivity, being one of the few species that can produce viable, fertile offspring unlike many other hybrids produced from crossing different species resulting in sterile hybrids with factors that limit their success of survival (e.g. the liger and mule). Hybrid macaws do not hold any scientific names, and are often labeled by the two macaw species they are produced from (e.g. scarlet macaw × green winged macaw)

There are 19 species of macaw, many of which can produce up to three generations (potentially more) of hybrids. Generation F1, being the most common, has the widest variety of hybrids and are the most popular and well known. Hybrid macaws are also often viable in generation F2 which means they are able to reproduce, unlike generation F3 and later due to a rising rate of sterility. The most popular hybrids include crossing with the blue and gold macaw, military macaw or scarlet macaw. Despite belonging to a different genus, hybrids between the hyacinth macaw and Ara species have also been produced.

Because macaw species are able to hybridize and produce viable offspring, scientists study and breed them in captivity to better understand hybridization, and understand their importance in preserving endangered macaw species. A study performed of the hybridization between the last wild Spix's macaw and an Illiger's macaw, provides evidence and important information that could potentially help establish endangered wild populations of the Spix's macaw, demonstrating how vital hybrid macaws are.

== Hybrid macaws in nature ==
The hybridization of macaws in the wild is less common than in captivity due to natural barriers and mating behaviors, although a few rare cases have been recorded. One example was the natural hybridization of a Spix's and Illiger's macaw recorded in Conservation Genetics (2001), which demonstrated two species of macaws producing offspring. This discovery created a major breakthrough in the preservation of this species and macaws as a whole as it is understood that the Spix's macaw may now be fully extinct in the wild.

== Hybrid macaws in captivity ==
The hybridization of macaws is usually due to the placement of multiple macaw species in the same enclosure. Breeders may choose to pair different species to intentionally produce hybrid offspring, or the parrots themselves may select such a partner due to a lack of a suitable conspecific of the opposite sex. Due to the rising interest in hybrid macaws in the exotic-pet trade, production has increased. Their distinct coloring makes them highly sought after by competitive and exotic-bird breeders and traders. They are also bred for their "pet quality" and personality traits which results from the mixing of two species of birds. One example is the hybridization of the Catalina macaw, which is bred for its intelligence and ability to respond to training, and the harlequin macaw, bred for its relaxed and calm personality. Although, behavior, temperament and coloring can vary from each hybrid.

Recently there has been an over abundance of female blue-and-yellow macaws in captivity, and they have been highly hybridized.

Some bird breeders consider intentionally breeding hybrid macaws, particularly endangered species, to be unethical - as to do so is to dilute bloodlines and potentially produce hybrids that appear to be identical to a parent species, yet contain genes from a supposedly separate species. This may prove to be detrimental to conservation efforts if the day ever comes when (as occurred with the Spix's macaw) captive macaws are required to maintain the existence of a pure species.

Hybrid macaws bred in captivity, despite having little conservation value in themselves, have successfully been used in zoological settings as surrogate parents for the eggs and chicks of endangered macaw species, successfully rearing the offspring without human intervention. In addition, a 2021 study exploring the use of free flight techniques developed by aviculturists and adapting these with the potential goal of returning captive-bred parrots to the wild featured several hybrid macaws as experimental participants.

== Macaw hybrid breeding types/generations ==
=== First-generation macaw – F1 ===
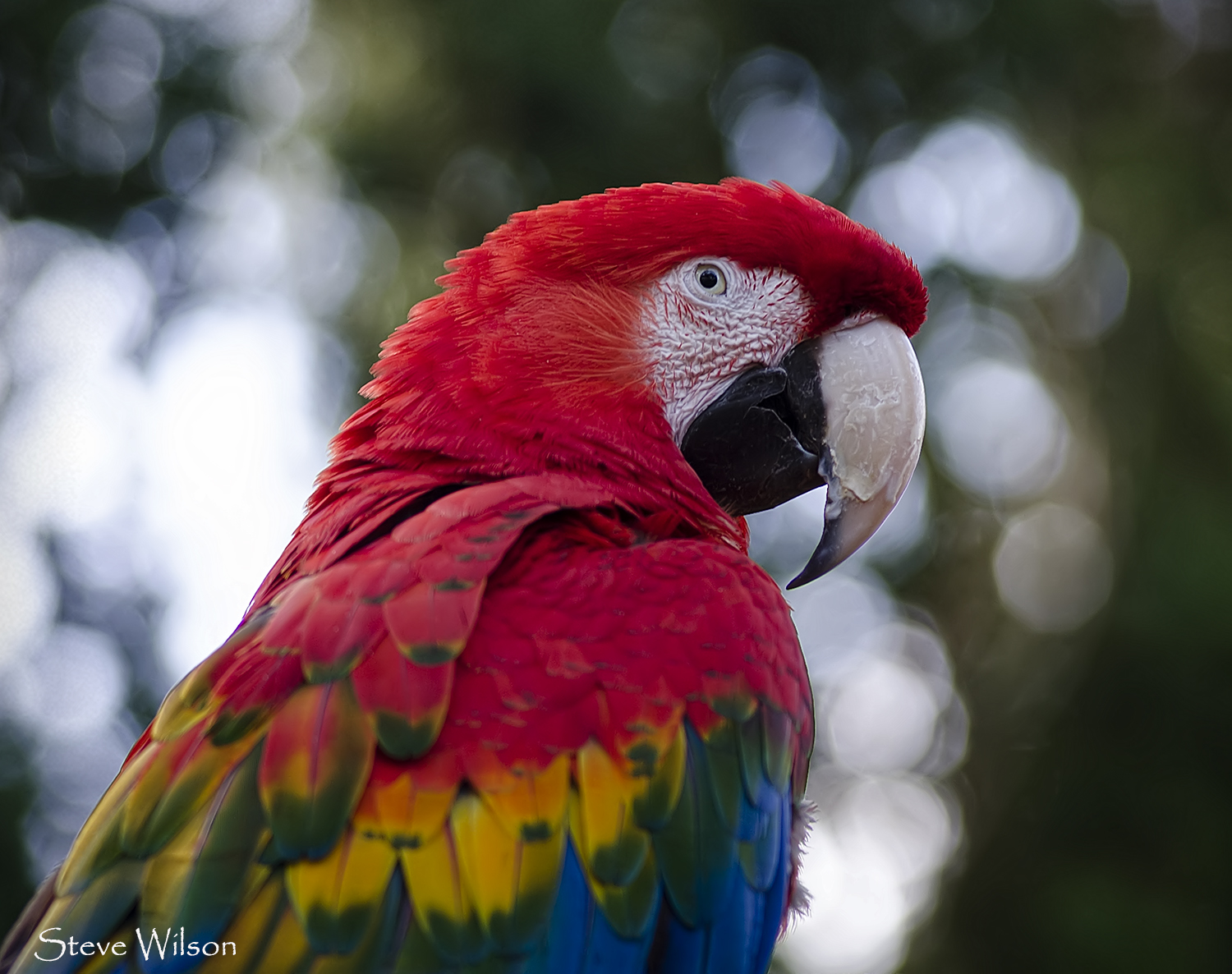
Ruby macaw

First-generation hybrid macaws are the most popular and abundant macaw hybrids. Examples:

F1 Hybrids of 5 commonly used parental species:
×	blue-and-gold macaw	Buffon's macaw	green-winged macaw	hyacinth macaw	military macaw	scarlet macaw
blue-and-gold macaw	(blue-and-gold macaw)	Bluffon's macaw (buffgold macaw)	Harlequin macaw	Caloshua macaw	Miligold macaw	Catalina macaw
Buffon's macaw	Bluffon's macaw (buffgold macaw)	(Buffon's macaw)	Buffwing macaw	Emerald macaw	Milifon macaw	Verde macaw
green-winged macaw	Harlequin macaw	Buffwing macaw	(green-winged macaw)	Hyaptere macaw	Calico macaw	Ruby macaw
hyacinth macaw	Caloshua macaw	Emerald macaw	Hyaptere macaw	(hyacinth macaw)	Milicinth macaw	Hyarlet macaw
military macaw	Miligold macaw	Milifon macaw	Calico macaw	Milicinth macaw	(military macaw)	Shamrock macaw
scarlet macaw	Catalina macaw	Verde macaw	Ruby macaw	Hyarlet macaw	Shamrock macaw	(scarlet macaw)

Other Examples

- Maui sunset = red-fronted macaw × blue-and-gold macaw
- Corrientes macaw = military macaw × blue-throated macaw

=== Second-generation macaw – F2 ===
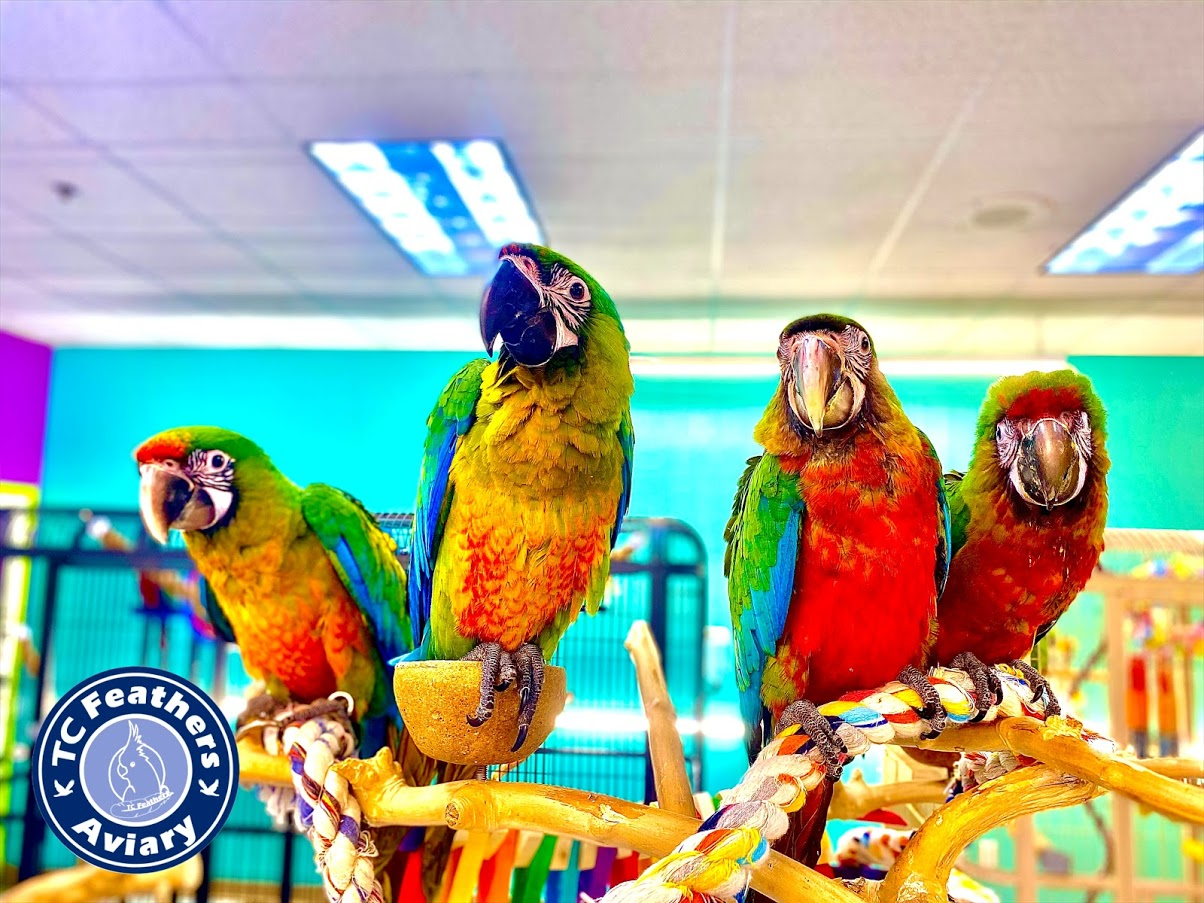
Young miliquin macaws

Examples:

x	Catalina macaw	harlequin macaw	ruby macaw	blue-and-gold macaw	green-winged macaw	scarlet macaw
Catalina macaw	(Catalina macaw)	Maui sunrise macaw	Rubalina macaw	Catablu macaw	Flame macaw	Camelot macaw
harlequin macaw	Maui sunrise macaw	(harlequin macaw)	Quatro macaw	Harligold macaw	Jubilee macaw	Tropicana macaw
ruby macaw	Rubalina macaw	Quatro macaw	(ruby macaw)	Ruby gold macaw	-	-

- Aqua blush macaw = blue-and-gold macaw x verde macaw
- Miliquin macaw = military macaw × harlequin macaw
- Starlight macaw = scarlet macaw × miligold macaw
- Sunburst macaw = scarlet macaw x verde macaw

=== Third-generation macaw – F3 ===
Examples:

x	camelot macaw
Catalina macaw	Camelina macaw
harlequin macaw	Fiesta macaw
scarlet macaw	Capri macaw

The Flamingold is another F3 hybrid, bred by Peter Barnes in 2024. The F3s are products of Flame × Blue and Gold macaws.
