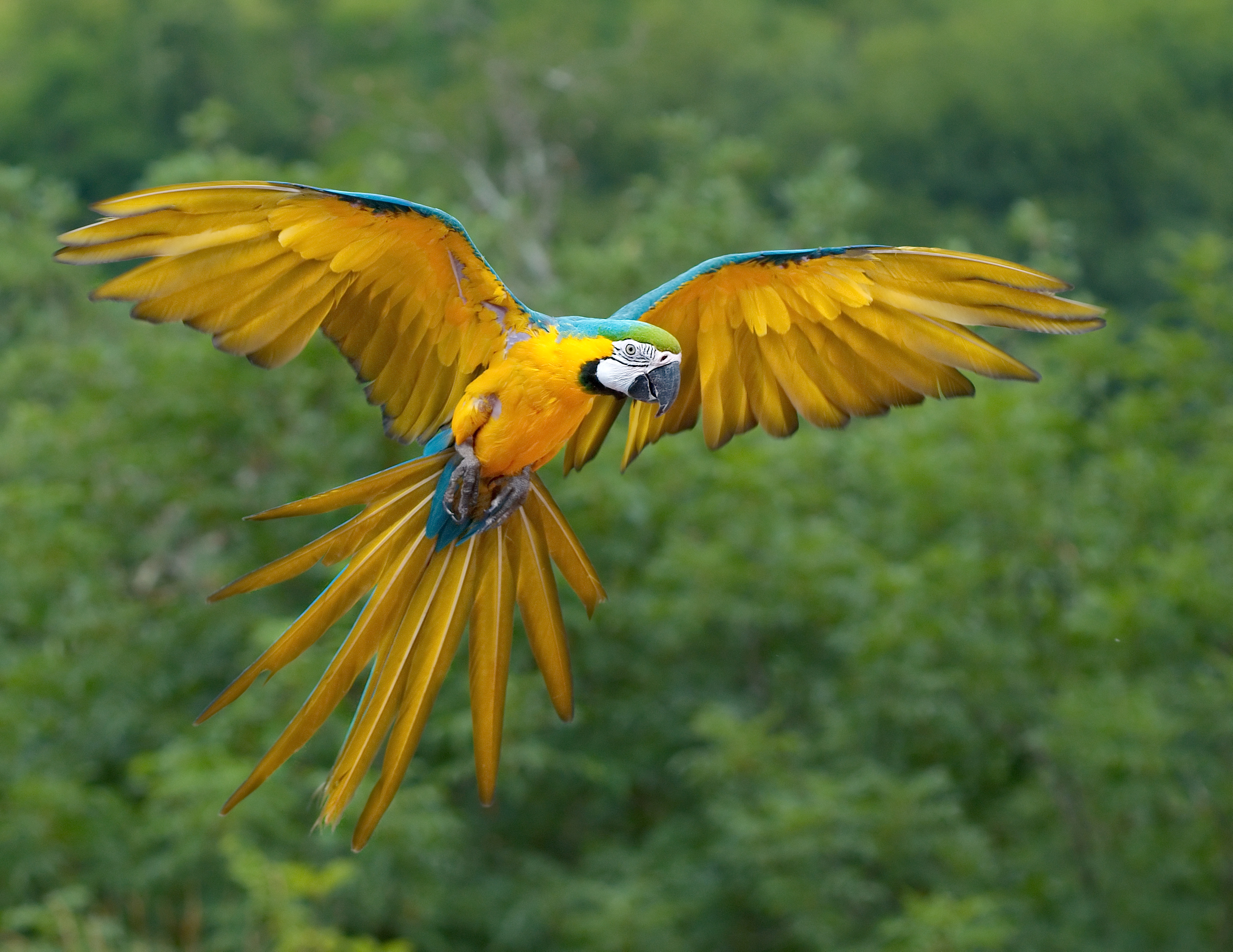
- Blue-and-yellow macaw in flight at Jurong Bird Park

Conservation status
- Least Concern (IUCN 3.1)
- CITES Appendix II

Scientific classification
- Kingdom: Animalia
- Phylum: Chordata
- Class: Aves
- Order: Psittaciformes
- Family: Psittacidae
- Genus: Ara
- Species: A. ararauna

Binomial name
- Ara ararauna (Linnaeus, 1758)
- Distribution

Synonyms
- Psittacus ararauna Linnaeus, 1758

= Blue-and-yellow macaw =

Species of bird

The blue-and-yellow macaw (Ara ararauna), also known as the blue-and-gold macaw, is a large Neotropical parrot with a mostly blue dorsum, light yellow/orange venter, and gradient hues of green on top of its head. It is a member of the large group of neotropical parrots known as macaws. It inhabits forest (especially varzea, but also in open sections of terra firme or unflooded forest), woodland, and savannah of tropical Central and South America, as well as the island of Trinidad in the Caribbean. They are popular in aviculture because of their striking color, ability to talk, ready availability in the marketplace, and close bonding to humans. It is the most commonly kept macaw species in captivity worldwide as a pet or companion parrot and is also the cheapest among the large macaws. As of 2025, there are 1 million blue and gold macaws living in captivity worldwide, one of the highest populations of any large parrot in captivity.

== Taxonomy ==
The blue-and-yellow macaw was formally described by the Swedish naturalist Carl Linnaeus in 1758 in the tenth edition of his Systema Naturae. He placed it with all the other parrots in the genus Psittacus and coined the binomial name Psittacus ararauna. This macaw is now one of the eight extant species within the Ara genus, first proposed in 1799 by the French naturalist Bernard Germain de Lacépède. The genus name is from ará meaning "macaw" in the Tupi language of Brazil. The word is an onomatopoeia based on the sound of their call. The specific epithet ararauna comes from the Tupi Arára úna meaning "big dark parrot" for the hyacinth macaw. The word ararauna had been used by the German naturalist Georg Marcgrave in 1648 in his Historia Naturalis Brasiliae. The species is monotypic: no subspecies are recognised.

== Description ==
These birds can reach a length of 81–91 cm (32–36 in) and weigh 1.0–1.5 kg (2–3 lb), making them some of the larger members of their family. They are vivid in appearance with bright aqua blue feathers on the top of their body, except for the head, which is lime colored. The bottom, however, is a rich, deep yellow/light orange. Their beak is black, as well as the feathers under their chin. Its feet are of a gray color, save for black talons. The bird has white skin, with its face having nearly no feathers besides a few black ones spaced apart from each other, forming a striped pattern around the eyes. The irises are pale light yellow.

Blue-and-yellow macaws can live from 30 to 35 years in the wild, and reach sexual maturity between the ages of 3 and 6 years.

Little variation in plumage is seen across the range. Some birds have a more orange or "butterscotch" underside color, particularly on the breast. This was often seen in Trinidad birds and others of the Caribbean area. The blue-and-yellow macaw uses its powerful beak for breaking nutshells and for climbing up and hanging from trees. As well as nuts, it will also feed on seeds, fruits, vegetable matter, bark, and leaves, also (reportedly but rarely) insects and snails.

== Distribution and habitat ==
This species occurs in Panama, Trinidad and Tobago, Colombia, Suriname, French Guiana, Venezuela, Guyana, Peru, Brazil, Bolivia, Ecuador, and Paraguay. The range extends slightly into Central America, where it is restricted to Panama. While most breed in rural and forested areas, small numbers breed in urban cities such as Rondonópolis, Mato Grosso, Brazil, nesting in dead palms planted for ornamental purposes alongside city roads. Although they were nearly extirpated in Trinidad due to human activity during the 1970s, a recent programme of reintroduction has proved successful. Between 1999 and 2003, wild-caught blue-and-yellow macaws were translocated from Guyana to Trinidad, in an attempt to reestablish the species in a protected area around the Nariva Swamp; despite this, the IUCN still lists them as extirpated from the country. A small breeding population descended from introduced birds is found in Puerto Rico, and another has inhabited Miami-Dade County, Florida, since the mid-1980s.

== Breeding ==
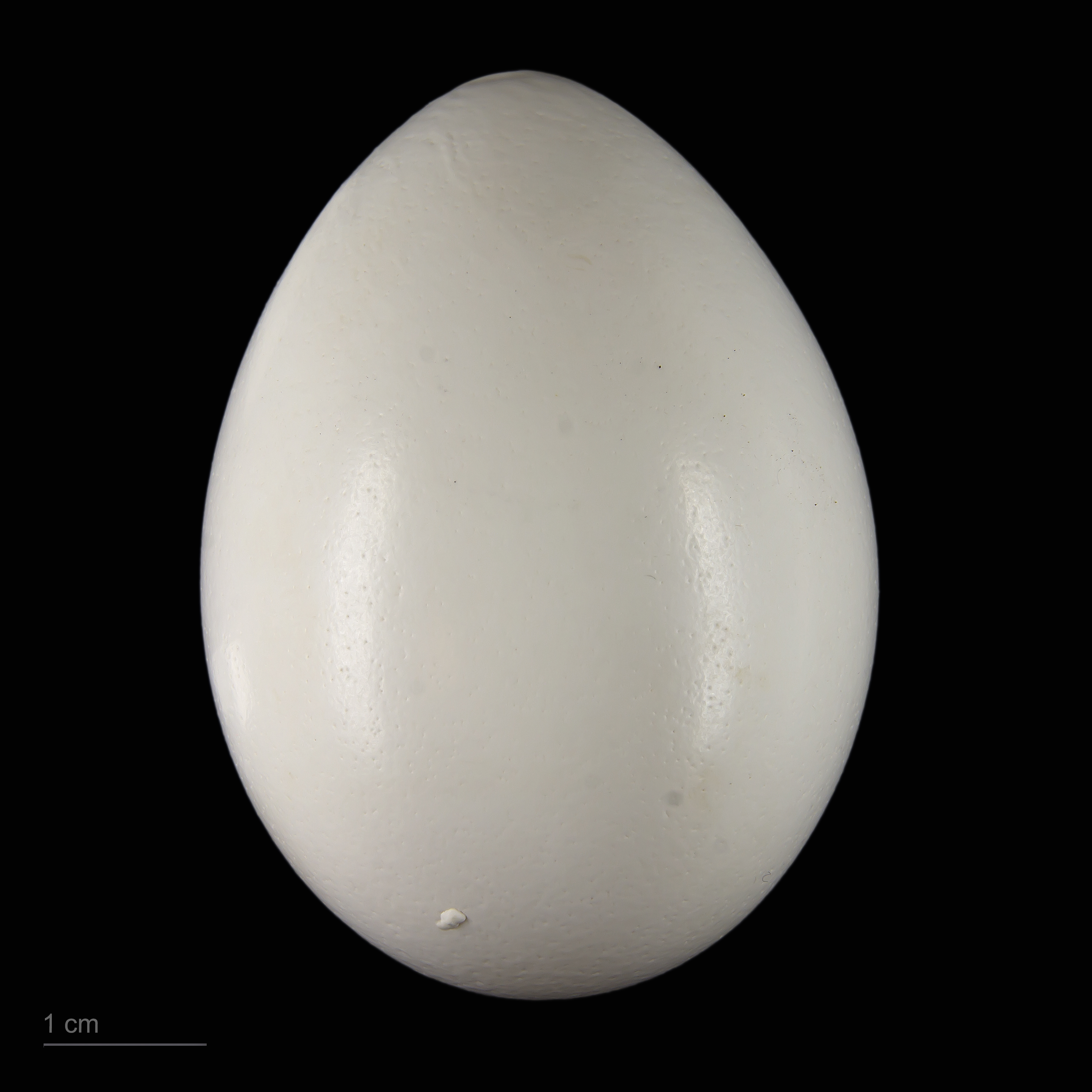
Ara ararauna egg in the Muséum de Toulouse

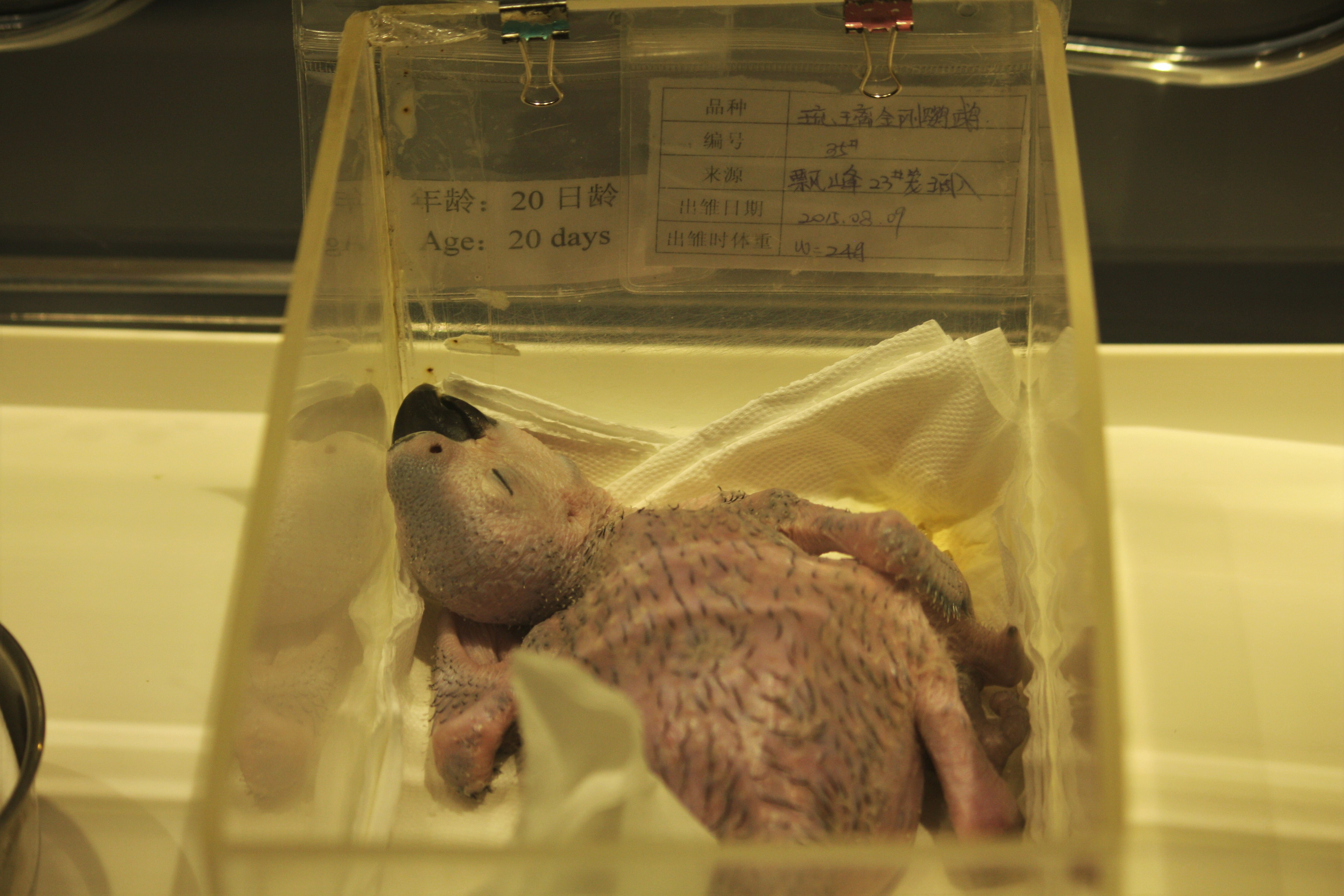
20-day-old blue-and-gold macaw in Guangzhou Zoo

The blue-and-yellow macaw generally mates for life. They nest almost exclusively in dead palms, and most nests are in Mauritia flexuosa palms. The female typically lays two or three eggs. The female incubates the eggs for about 28 days. One chick is dominant and gets most of the food; the others perish in the nest. Chicks fledge from the nest about 97 days after hatching. The male bird's color signals readiness for breeding. The brighter and bolder the colors, the better the chance of getting a mate.

== Conservation and threats ==
The blue-and-yellow macaw is on the verge of being extirpated in Paraguay, but it still remains widespread and fairly common in a large part of mainland South America. The species is therefore listed as Least Concern by BirdLife International. Its wild population has not been quantified but is believed to be above 10,000 individuals and is in decline. It is listed on CITES Appendix II, trade restricted.

== Aviculture ==
Even well-tended blue-and-yellow macaws are known to "scream" for attention and make other loud noises. Loud vocalizations, especially "flock calls", and destructive chewing are natural parts of their behavior and should be expected in captivity. Due to their large size, they also require plentiful space in which to fly around. According to World Parrot Trust, an enclosure for a blue-and-yellow macaw should, if possible, be at least 15 m (50 ft) in length. Captive macaws, kept with good diet, exercise, and veterinary care, are known to have lived 60 or more years. People considering a macaw as a companion parrot must be aware of this and consider that the bird may outlive the owner.

The blue-and-yellow macaw has been noted to blush its bare facial skin and fluff the feathers of its cheeks, head, and nape when interacting with humans. This may be an expression of the parrot's emotional state.

Archaeologically, feathers found in a Yschma tomb near the temple of Pachacamac from this species demonstrate cross-Andes trade c. 1000–1470 CE.

== Gallery ==
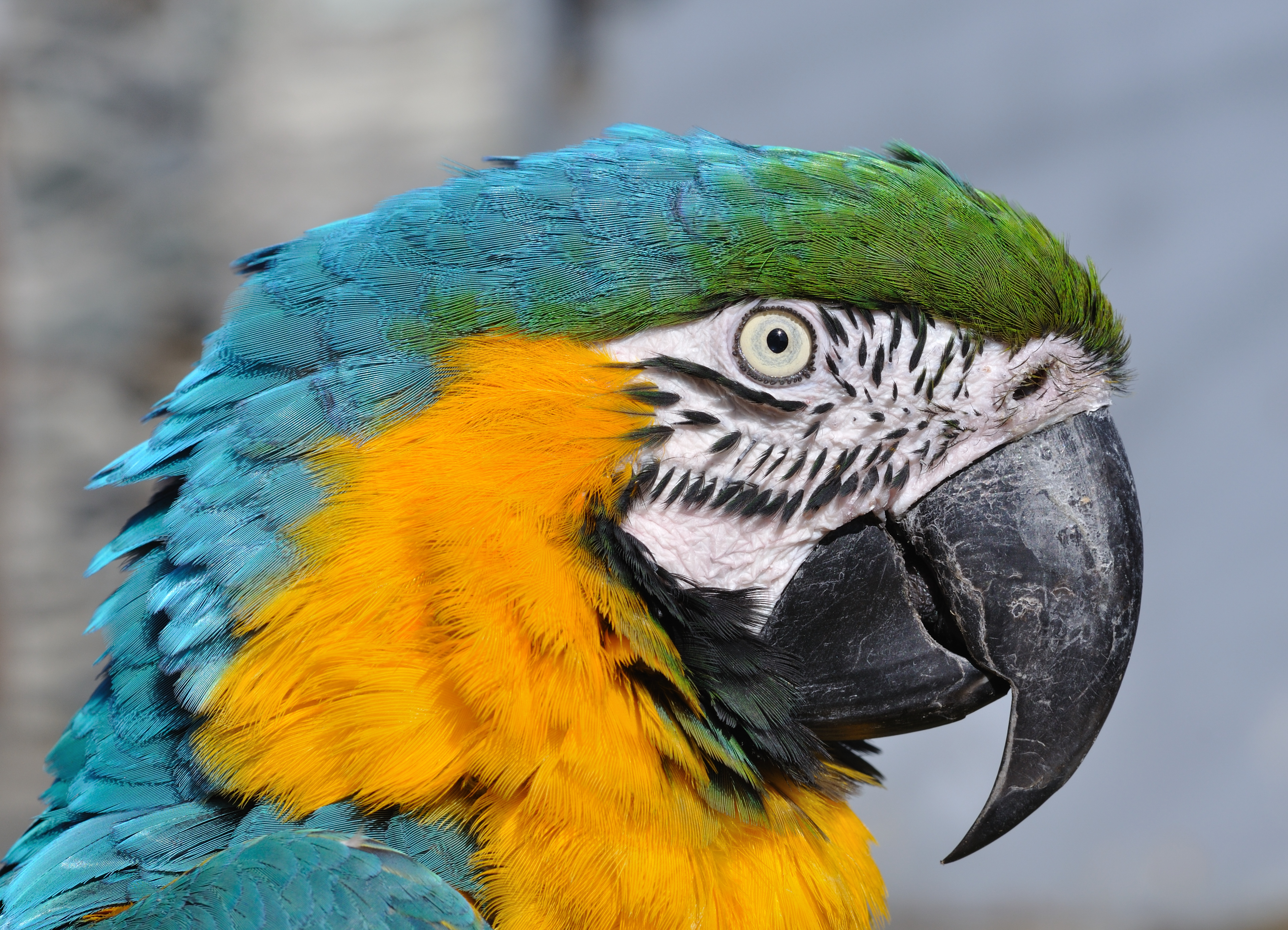
Head in high detail, Vogelburg (bird park), Weilrod, Germany

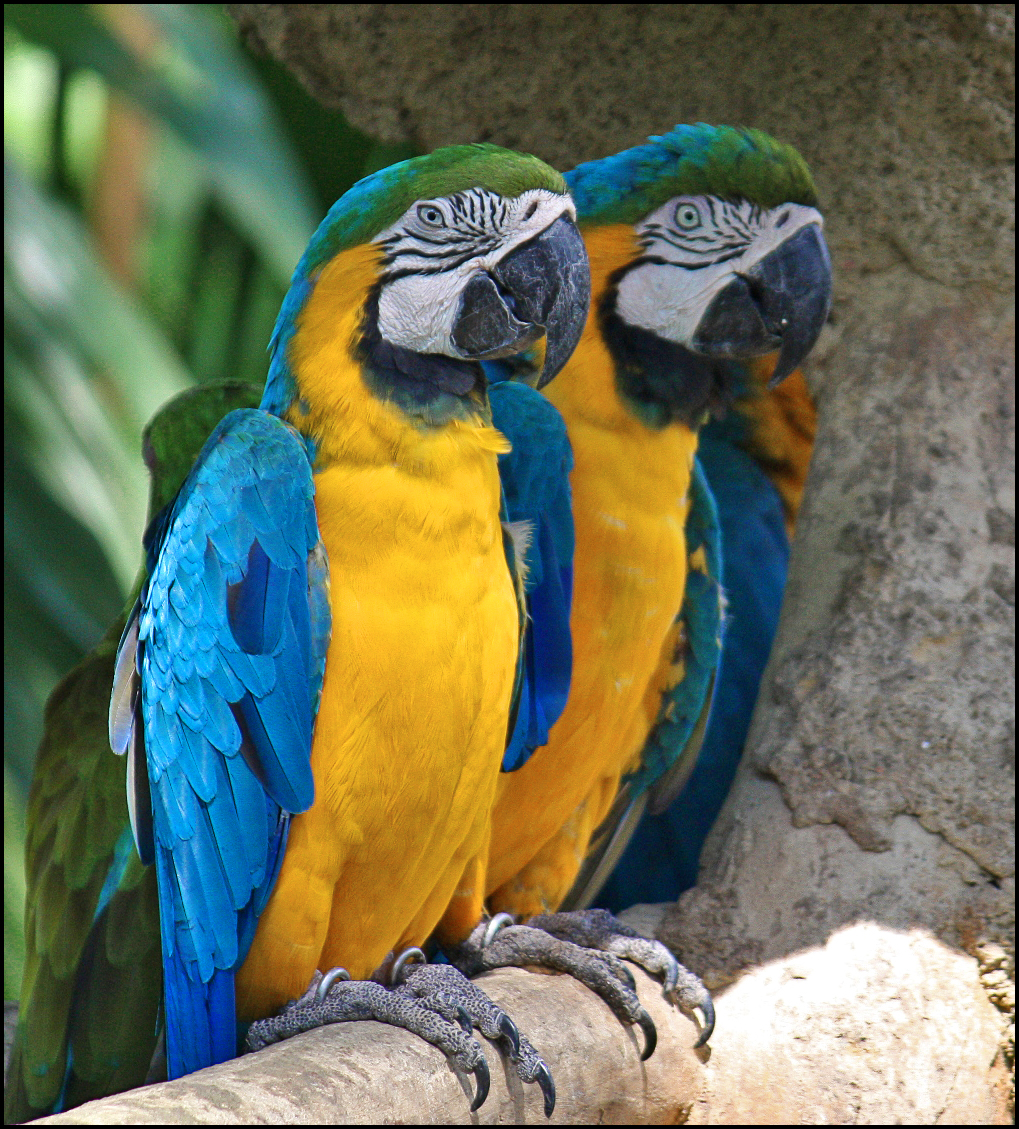
Two macaws, showing their colorful feathers

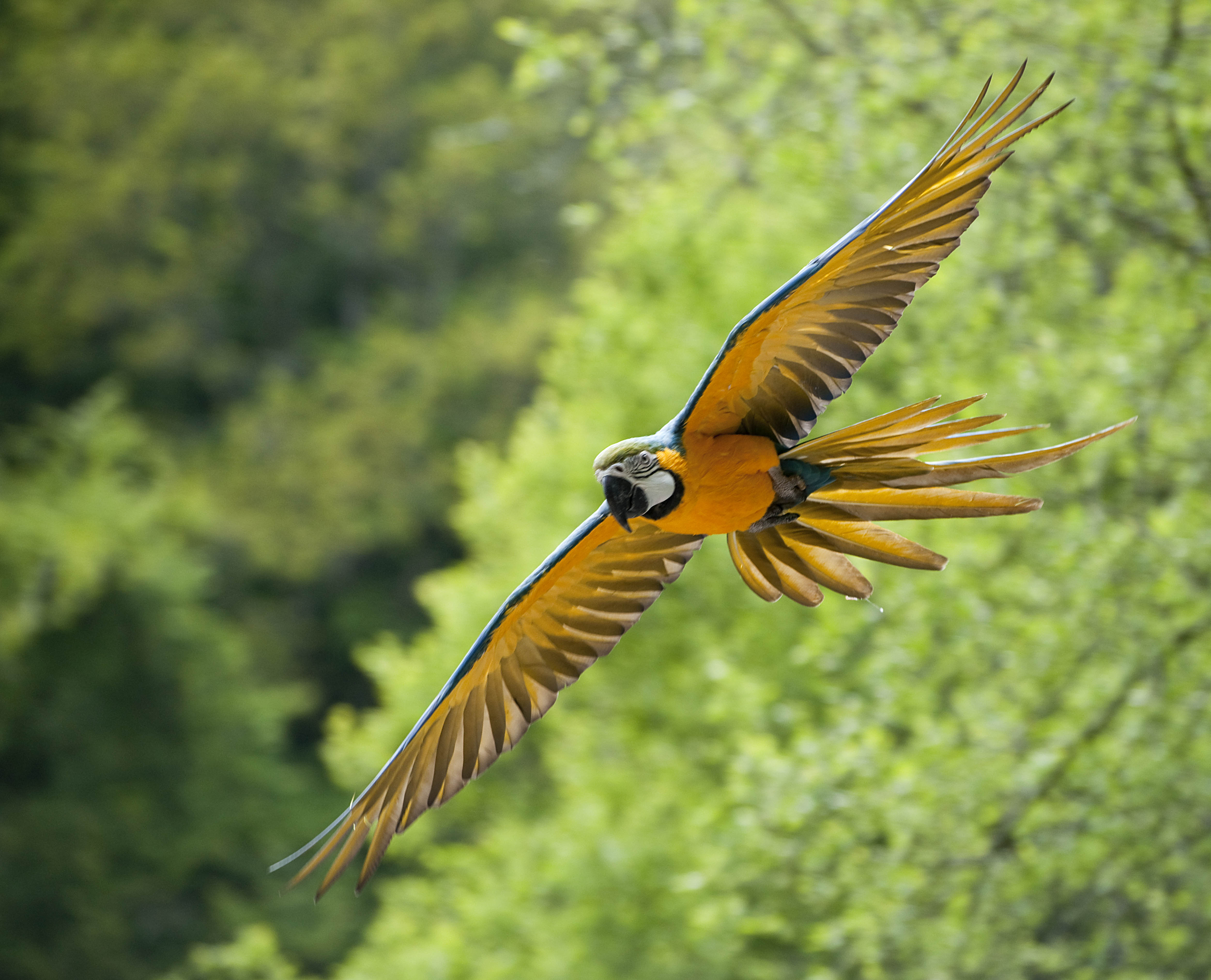
Flying at Zoo de Pont-Scorff, Morbihan, France

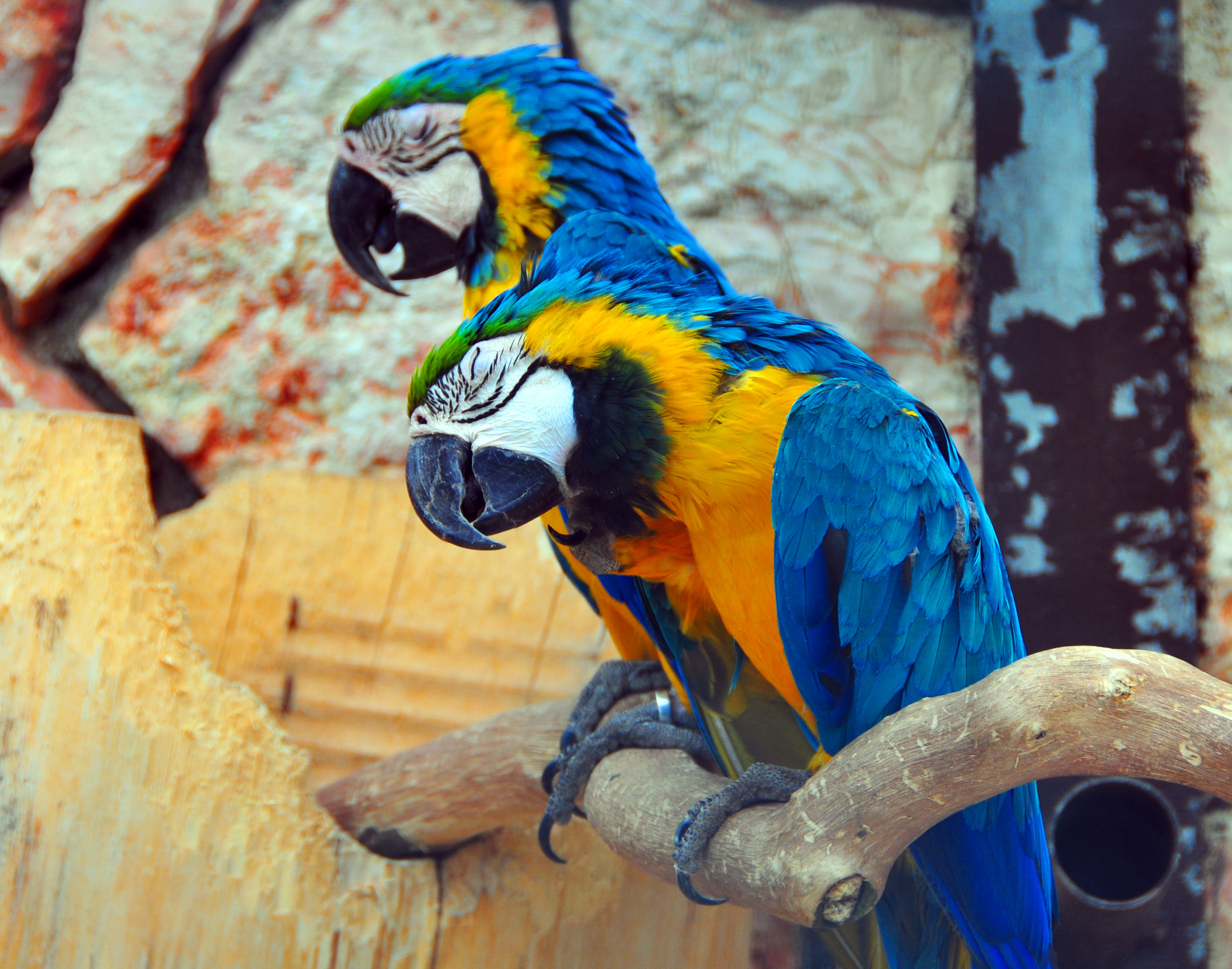
Sleepy couple at Weltvogelpark Walsrode (Walsrode Bird Park, Germany)

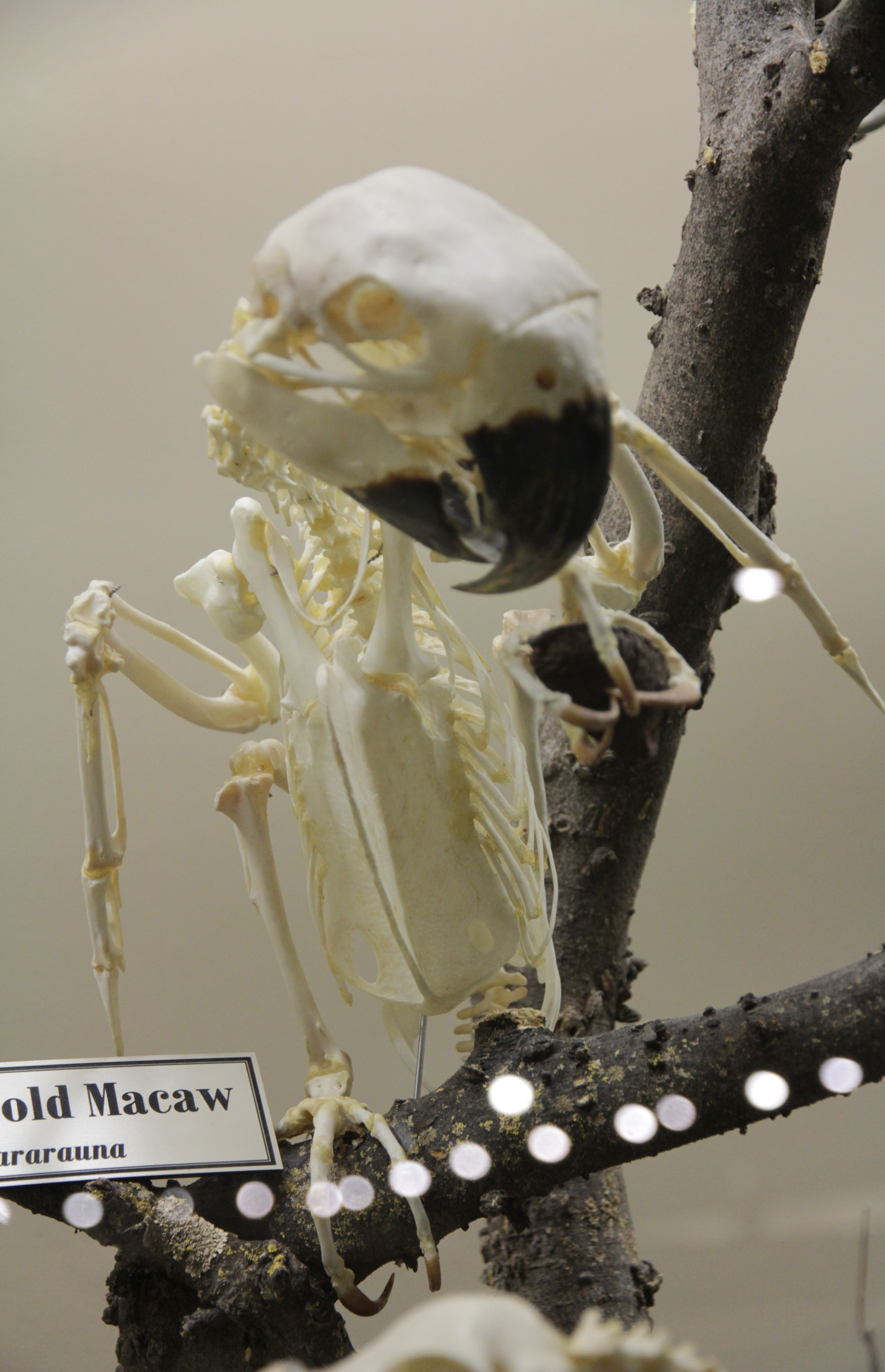
Blue and yellow macaw skeleton (Museum of Osteology)

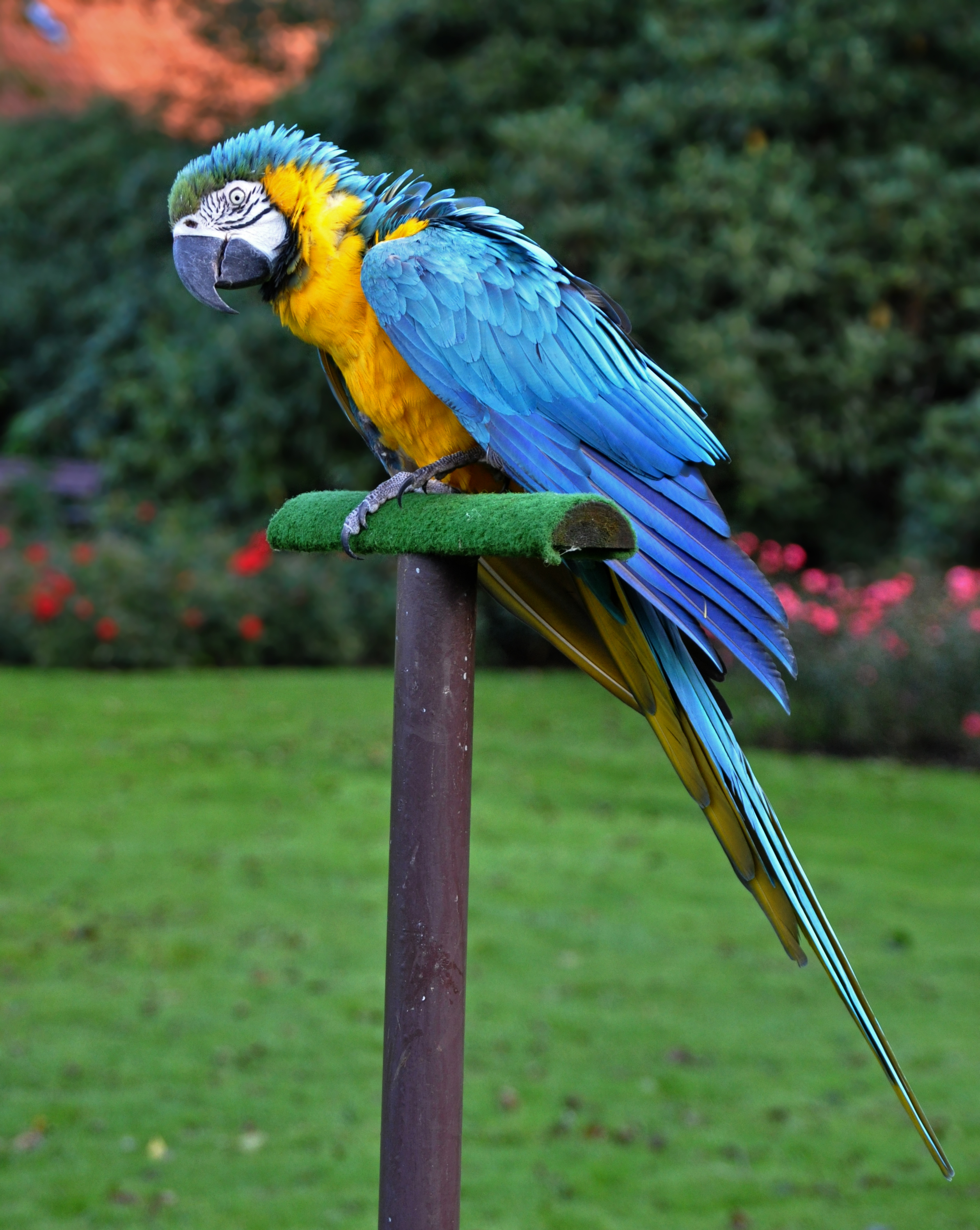
At Walsrode Bird Park, Germany

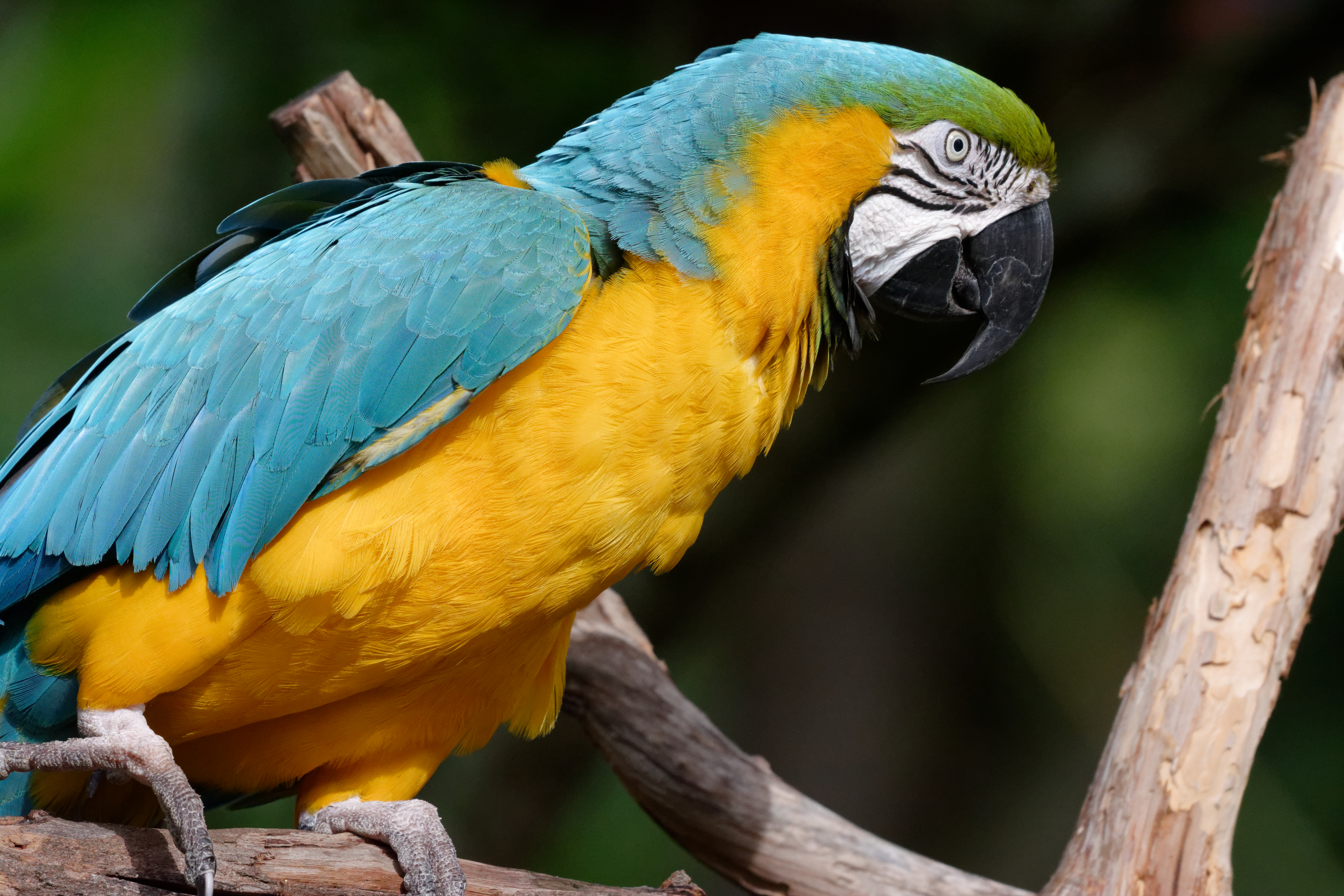
Alligator Farm in Florida, US

Video clip

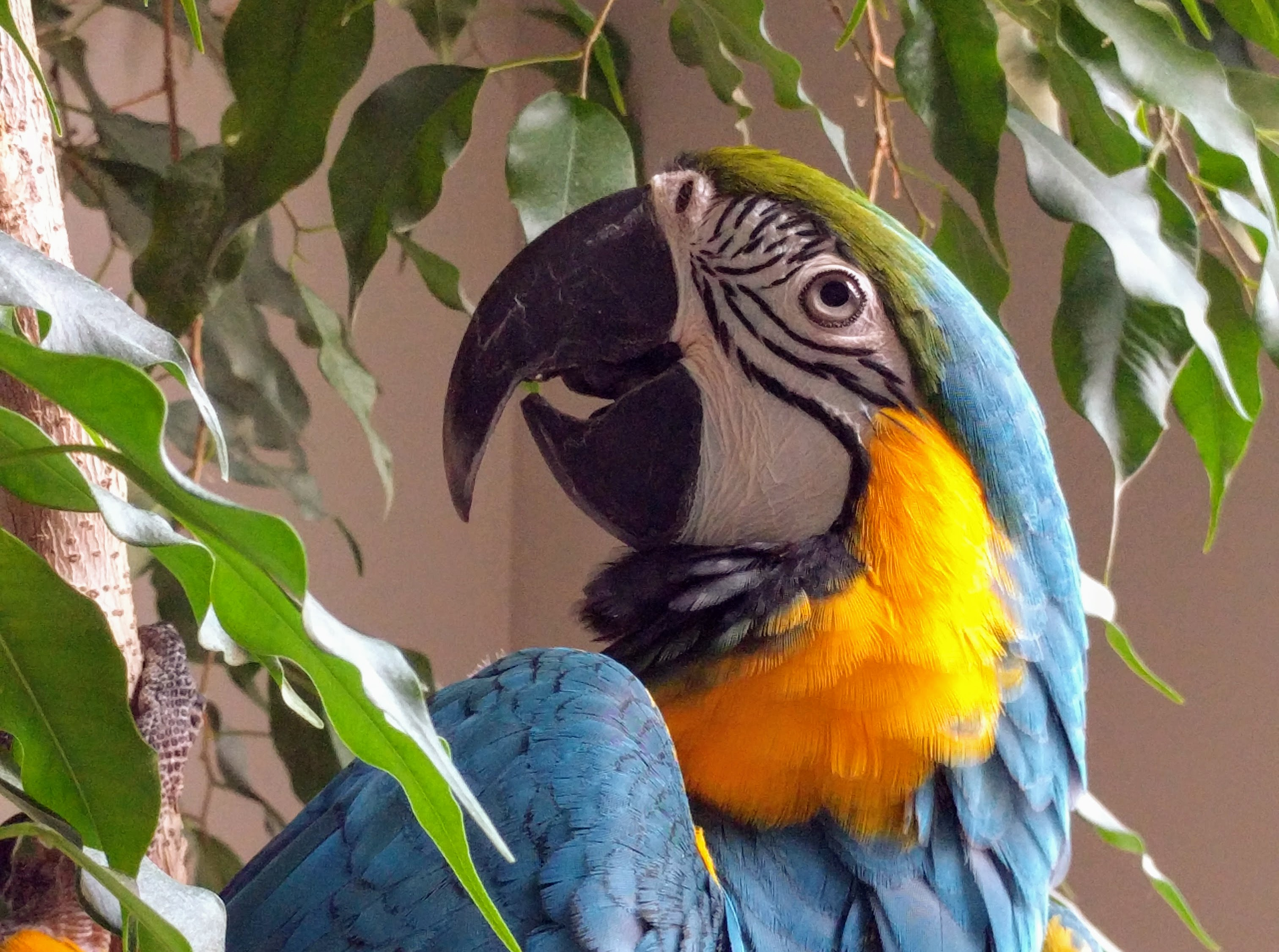
Macaw in captivity, Florida, US

Blue-and-yellow macaws in Brazil

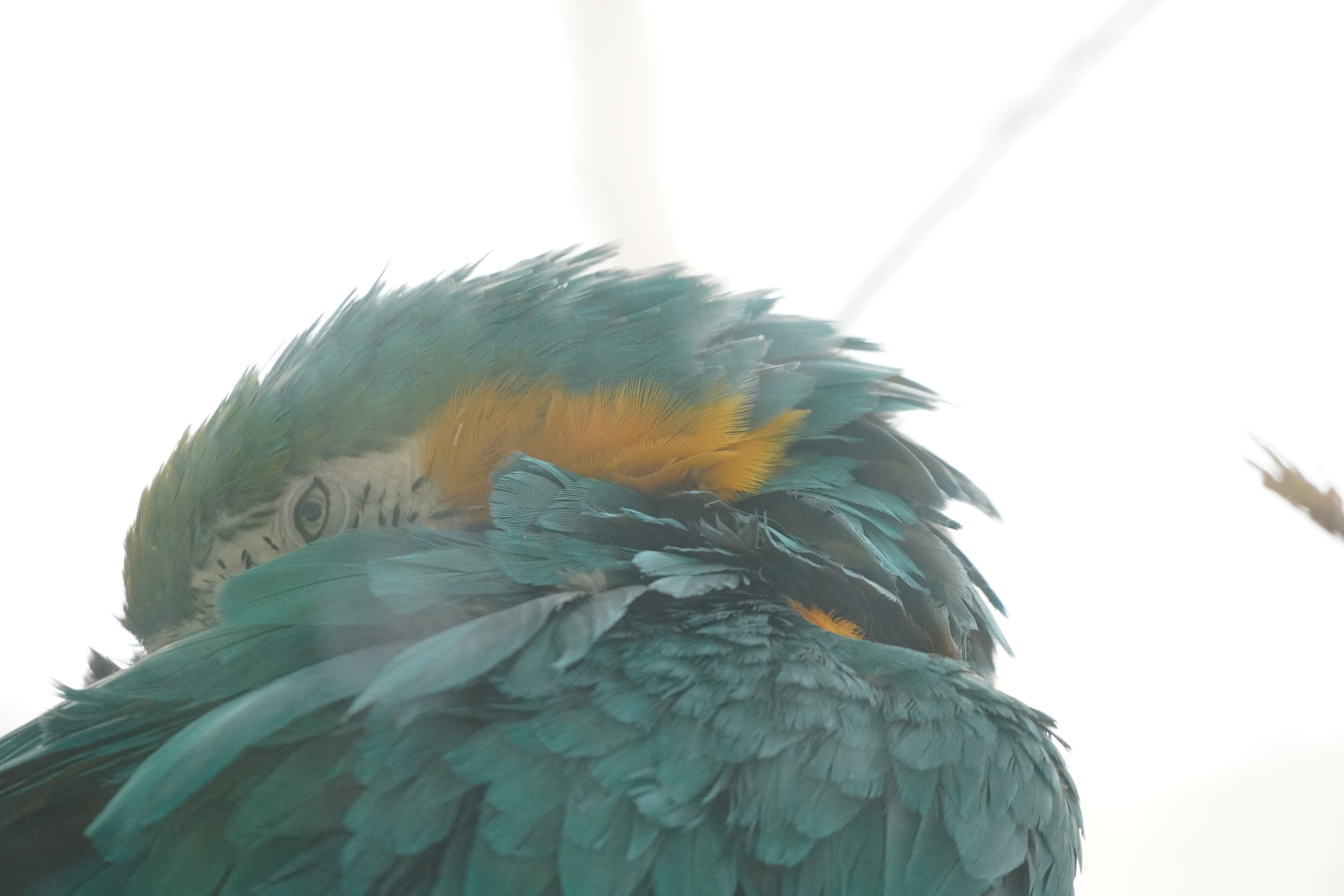
A specimen from the Parque de Las Leyendas

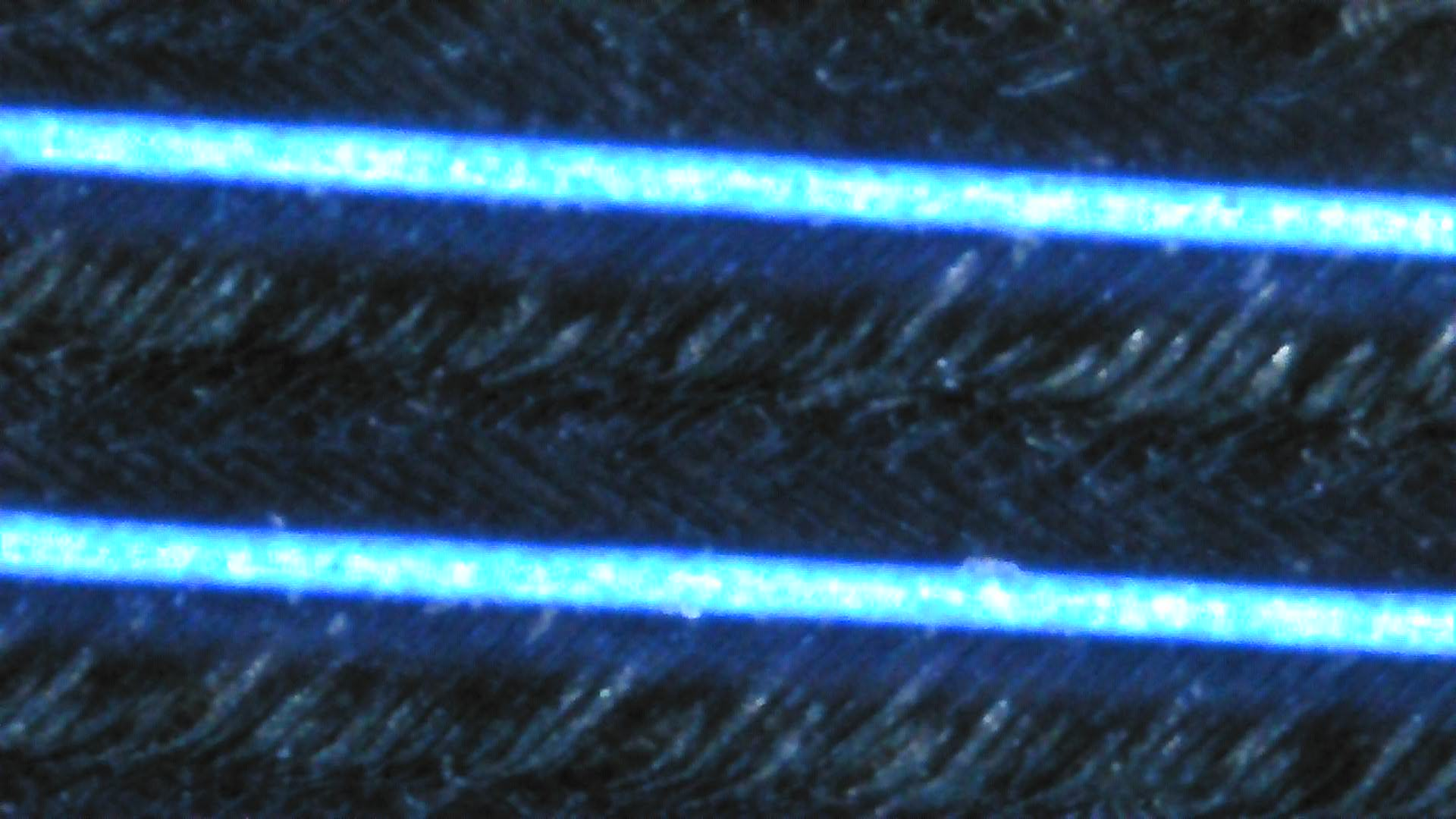
Close-up of a feather of a specimen from Peru

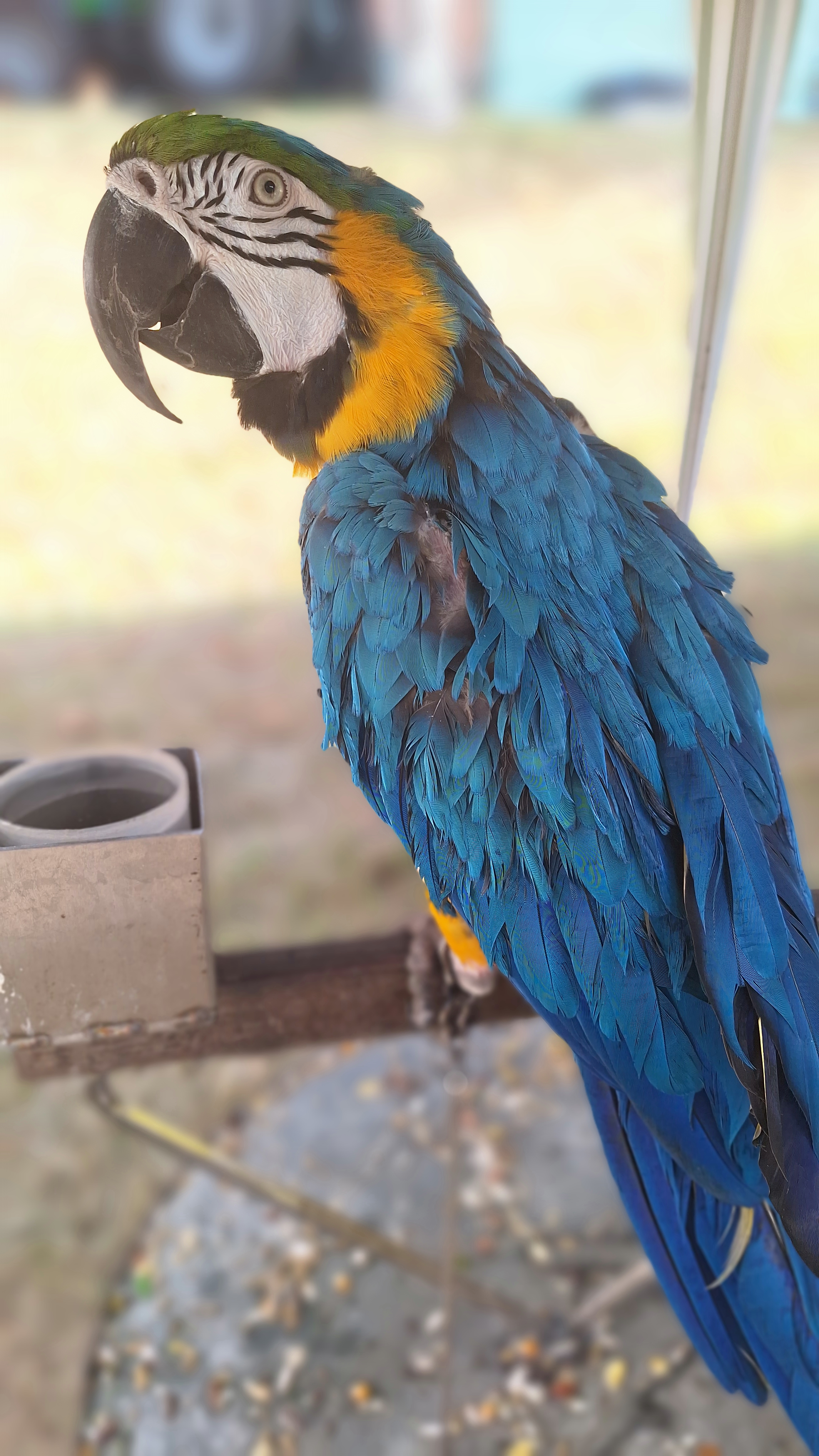
Macaw in a bird fair in Italy

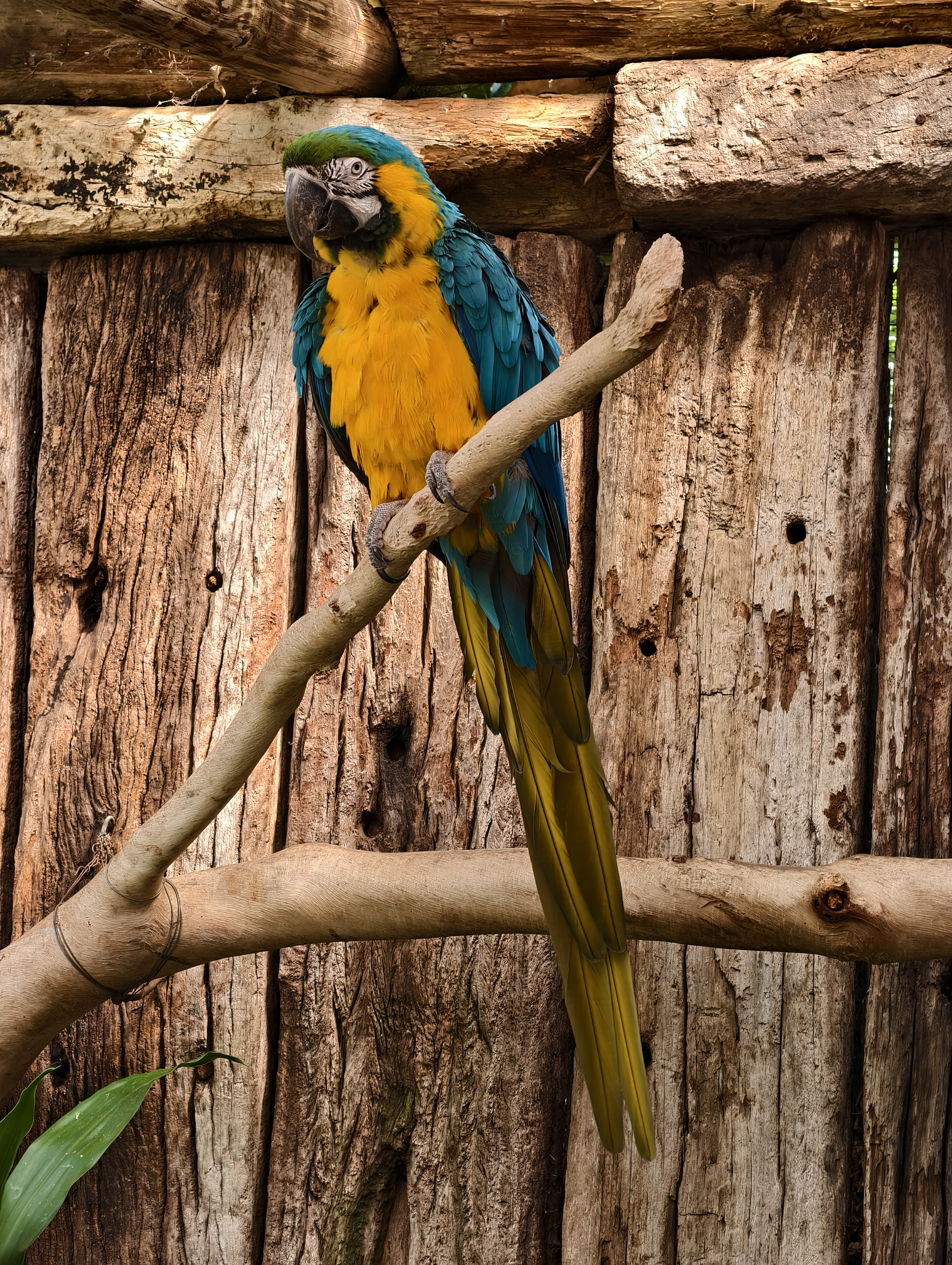
Blue-and-yellow macaw, World of Birds Wildlife Sanctuary & Monkey Park, Hout Bay, South Africa

== See also ==
- List of macaws
