= Saud bin Muhammed Al Thani =

Qatari prince

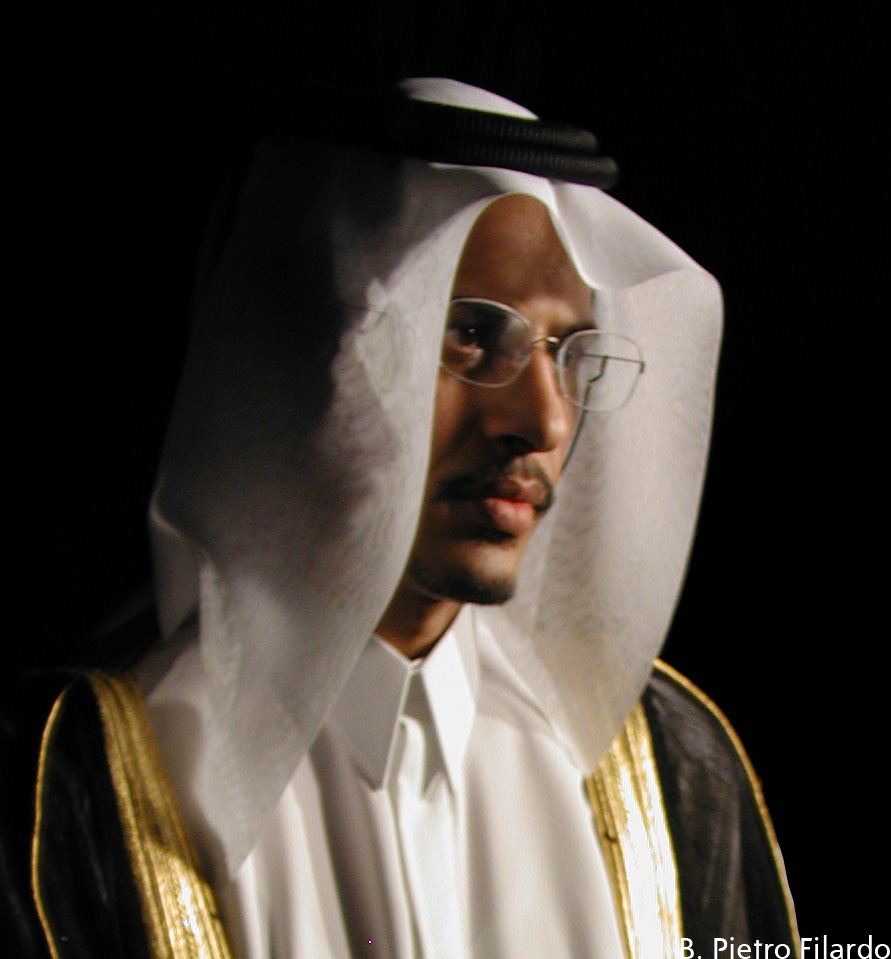
Sheikh Saud Al Thani in 2002.

Saud bin Muhammad bin Ali bin Abdullah bin Jassim bin Muhammed Al Thani (28 February 1966 – 9 November 2014) was a Qatari prince who served as minister of Culture, Arts and Heritage.

By the turn of the 21st century, Shaikh Sa’ud had established an international reputation as an avid art collector, both for his own collection as well as those of several state-owned museums he oversaw in Qatar.

== Activity ==
=== Culture and art ===
As Minister of Culture, Arts, and Heritage from 1997, he was entrusted with creating the collections to fill an ambitious program of world-class museums in Qatar, including a Museum of Islamic Art a combined Qatar National Library and Natural History Museum, a Museum of Photography, and a Museum of Traditional Clothes & Textiles. In 2005 he was investigated for misuse of public funds and dismissed from his post.

=== Various collections ===
He collected a Leica APO-Telyt-R 1:5.6/1600mm lens, furniture, vintage cars, natural history, jewellery, even bicycles, but it was sometimes unclear if the collections he had assembled belonged to him or to Qatar. At the time of his death, he owned the blue diamond the Idol's Eye.

=== Wildlife preservation ===
Al Thani founded the Al Wabra Wildlife Preservation (AWWP), a private conservation and endangered species breeding center in Qatar, which focuses on breeding and preservation of rare bird species, particularly the Spix's macaw. Al Wabra is also an important centre for endangered Arabian species such as the Arabian sand gazelle and the Arabian oryx.

=== Photography competition ===
The Sheikh also founded the Al-Thani Awards in 2000. It claims to be the biggest photography competition in the Middle-East with roughly 54,000 entrants in 2010.

== Private life, death ==
He was married to Sheikha Amna bint Ahmad bin Hassan bin Abdullah bin Jassim Al Thani.

In the chapter "Goldeneye" from the book Travels with Myself (from Tahir Shah), the author narrates a visit to Saud's home and his magnificent art collection.

Saud bin Muhammed Al Thani died in London on 9 November 2014.

=== Children ===
- Hamad bin Saud
- Sara bint Saud
- Moza bint Saud
