= Al Wabra Wildlife Preservation =

Wildlife preserve in Qatar

Al Wabra Wildlife Preservation (AWWP) is a privately owned zoological facility in central Qatar near Al-Shahaniya founded by Qatari Prince Saud bin Muhammed Al Thani. The preservation accommodates the World Heritage Cycad Gene Bank (WHCGB), which operates in conjunction under formal agreement with several overseas national governments to protect both in situ and ex situ this family of prehistoric plants. The preserve is home to roughly 2,000 animals and has a staff of over 200. It occupies 2.5 square kilometers of land, including a 1,000-square-meter state of the art climate controlled greenhouse.

The preserve is known for breeding endangered and threatened species of animals and vascular plants, including the beira antelope, golden-headed lion tamarin, dibatag, Encephalartos, Sudan cheetah and North African ostrich. It is most noted for its breeding of Spix's macaw, one of the rarest bird species in the world.
