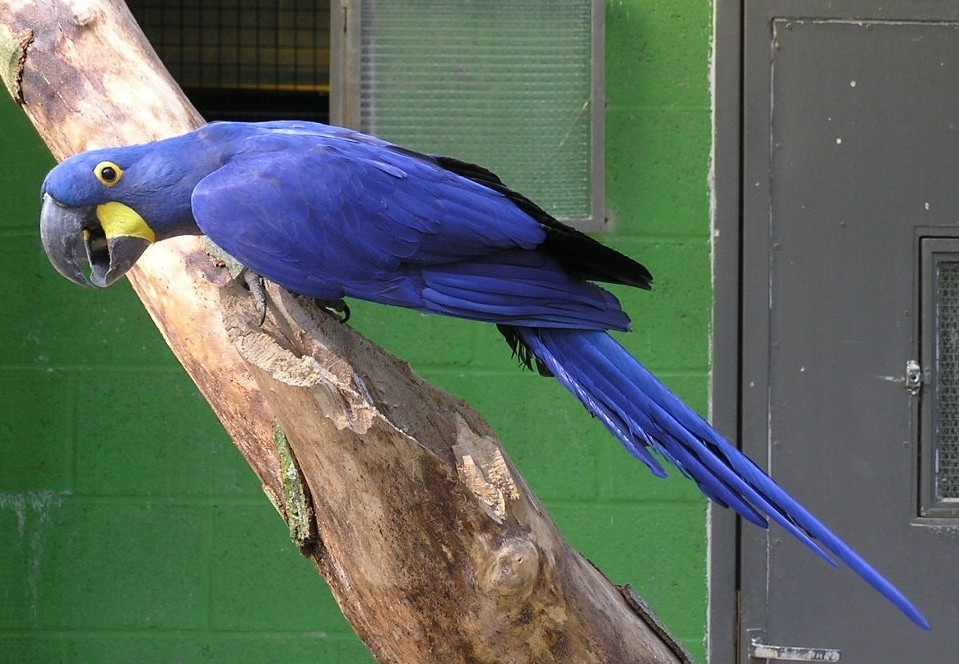
- Hyacinth macaw

Scientific classification
- Kingdom: Animalia
- Phylum: Chordata
- Class: Aves
- Order: Psittaciformes
- Family: Psittacidae
- Tribe: Arini
- Genus: Anodorhynchus; Spix, 1824

Type species
- Anodorhynchus maximiliani = Anodorhynchus hyacinthinus von Spix 1824

Species
- A. glaucus (Vieillot, 1816); A. hyacinthinus (Latham, 1790); A. leari Bonaparte, 1856

= Anodorhynchus =

Genus of birds

Anodorhynchus is a genus of large blue macaws from open and semi-open habitats in central and eastern South America. It includes two extant species, the hyacinth macaw and Lear's macaw also known as the indigo macaw, and one probably extinct species, the glaucous macaw. At about 100 centimetres (39 in) in length the hyacinth macaw is the longest parrot in the world. Glaucous and Lear's macaws are exclusively cliff nesters; hyacinth macaws are mostly tree nesters. The three species mainly feed on the nuts from a few species of palms (notably Acrocomia aculeata, Attalea phalerata, Butia yatay and Syagrus coronata).

While blue macaws have been known from taxidermic and captive specimens since at least 1790, location of the Lear's macaw's endemic habitat wasn't known until 1978.

The glaucous macaw was extirpated in the 1800s by clearance for agriculture and cattle grazing of the yatay palm (Butia yatay) groves upon which it fed, though rumors of its continued existence persist. Lear's macaws have made a comeback from near extinction in the early 1980s (about 60 birds) to over 1000 as a result of conservation programs. Hyacinth macaws remain locally common within parts of their range, but their range has become fragmented into three known distinct populations in southern Brazil, eastern Bolivia and northeastern Paraguay; populations are declining due to extensive trapping for the pet trade as well as habitat loss.

All Anodorhynchus macaws are listed on CITES Appendix I.

== Taxonomy ==
The genus, Anodorhynchus Spix, 1824 is one of six genera of Central and South American macaws in tribe Arini of macaws, parakeets and closely related genera. The macaws and parakeets comprise the clade of long-tailed parrots which with sister clade the short-tailed Amazonian parrots and allies make up subfamily Arinae of Neotropical parrots in family Psittacidae of true parrots. There are three currently recognized species (two extant and one probably extinct), all monotypic:

Some recent commentators have suggested that the allopatric Lear's macaw and glaucous macaw should be considered conspecifics.

Besides the three recognised species, there is the violet macaw, Anodorhynchus purpurascens, which was described by Rothschild and featured in his book, Extinct Birds published in 1907, but there is very little evidence to support it as separate species and it should be regarded as a hypothetical extinct species. In the absence of a specimen, Rothschild scientifically described and named it as a separate species based on the evidence that violet macaws were said to have inhabited the island of Guadeloupe; however, they were probably hyacinth macaws imported from the mainland of South America.

=== Species details ===
Genus Anodorhynchus – Spix, 1824 – three species
Common name	Scientific name and subspecies	Range	Size and ecology	IUCN status and estimated population
Glaucous macaw	Anodorhynchus glaucus (Vieillot, 1816)	South America (probably extinct)	Size: 70 cm (28 in) long, mostly pale turquoise-blue with a large greyish head. It has a long tail and a large bill. It has a yellow, bare eye-ring and half-moon-shaped lappets bordering the mandible. Habitat: Diet:	CR
Hyacinth macaw	Anodorhynchus hyacinthinus (Latham, 1790)	South America	Size: 100 cm (39 in) long, 120–140 cm (47–55 in) wingspan. It is almost entirely blue and has black under the wings. It has a large black beak with bright yellow along the sides of the lower part of the beak and also yellow eyerings. Habitat: Diet:	VU
Indigo macaw	Anodorhynchus leari (Bonaparte, 1856)	Brazil	Size: 70 cm (28 in) long, mainly blue and the head is a slightly paler blue. It has bare pale yellow skin at the base of its beak and orange-yellow eyerings. It has a large blackish beak. Habitat: Diet:	EN

== See also ==
- List of macaws
- Spix's macaw, another distantly related blue macaw
