= Curaçá =

Municipality of Bahia, Brazil

- Municipality
- The Municipality of Curaçá
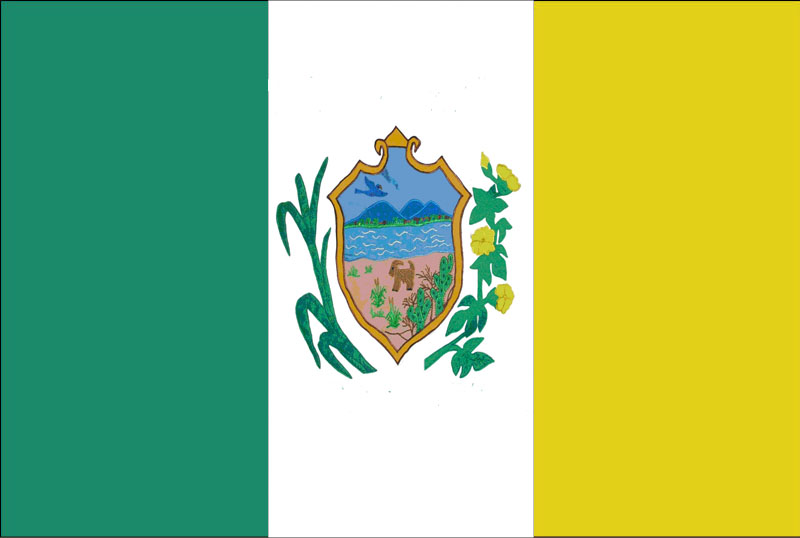
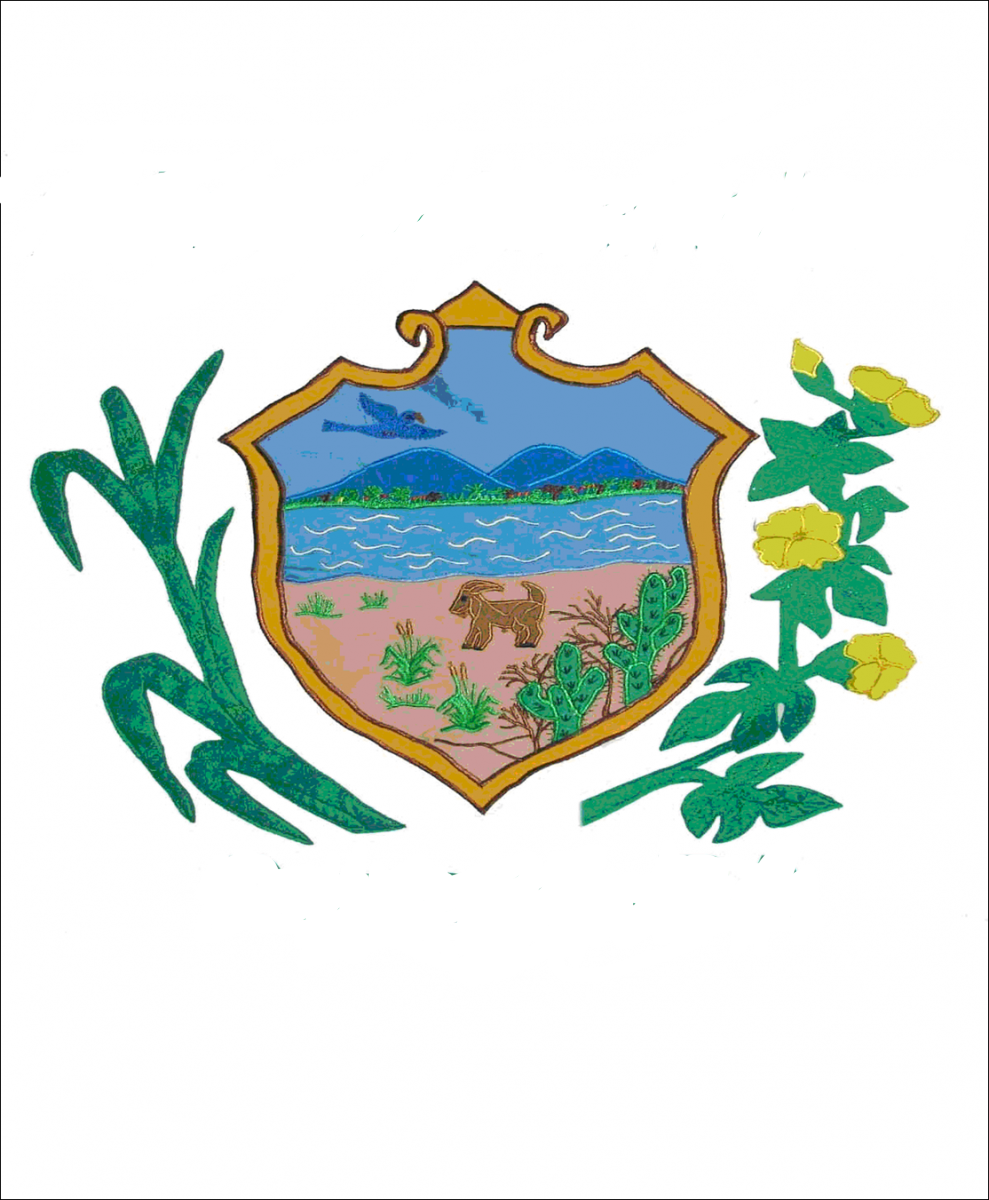
- Flag Coat of arms

- Localization of the city
- Coordinates: 08°59′31″S 39°54′28″W
- Country: Brazil
- Region: Northeast
- State: Bahia
- Founded: July 6, 1832

Government
  - Mayor: Pedro Oliveira (2016–2020)

Area
  - Total: 6,442.190 km^{2} (2,487.343 sq mi)

Population (2020)
  - Total: 34,886
  - Density: 4.9/km^{2} (13/sq mi)
- Time zone: UTC−3 (BRT)
- HDI (2010): 0.700 – high
- Website: www.curaca.ba.gov.br

Curaçá is the northernmost city in the Brazilian state of Bahia.

The municipality was designated a priority area for conservation and sustainable use when the Caatinga Ecological Corridor was created in 2006.

== See also ==
- List of municipalities in Bahia
