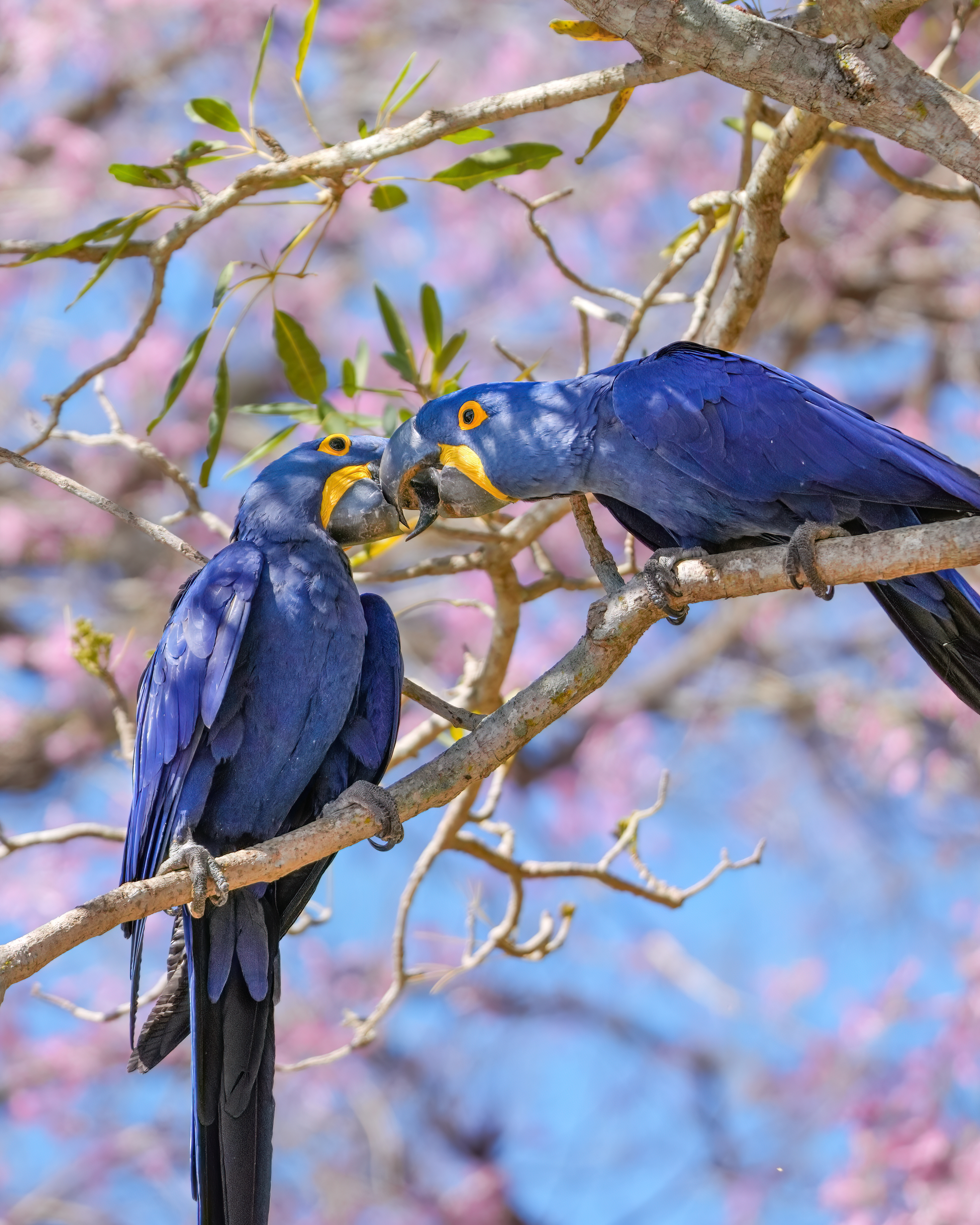
- Two hyacinth macaws perching on a pink Ipê tree, Encontro das Águas State Park, Brazil
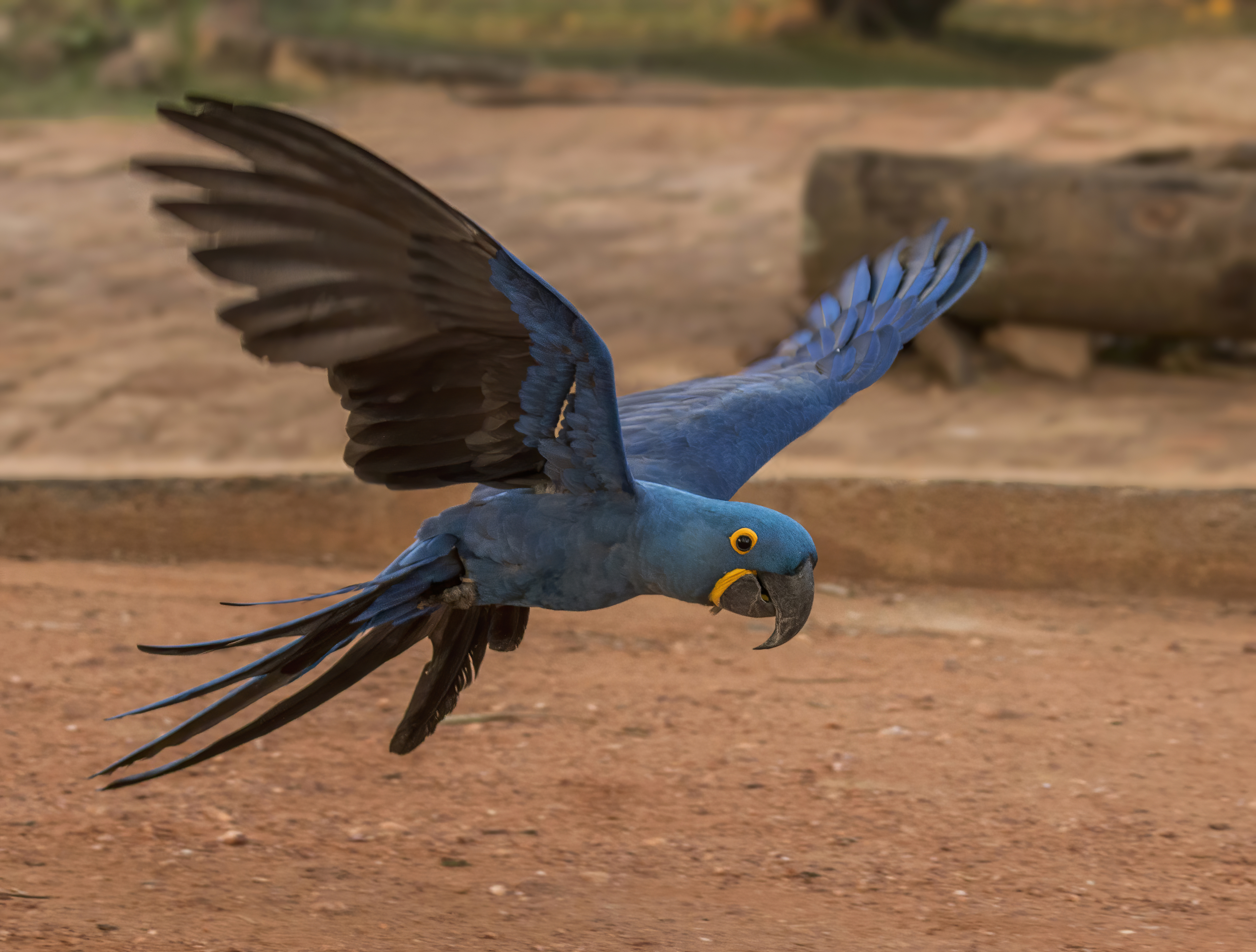
- In flight, the Pantanal, Brazil

Conservation status
- Vulnerable (IUCN 3.1)
- CITES Appendix I

Scientific classification
- Kingdom: Animalia
- Phylum: Chordata
- Class: Aves
- Order: Psittaciformes
- Family: Psittacidae
- Genus: Anodorhynchus
- Species: A. hyacinthinus

Binomial name
- Anodorhynchus hyacinthinus (Latham, 1790)

= Hyacinth macaw =

Species of bird (parrot)

The hyacinth macaw (Anodorhynchus hyacinthinus), or hyacinthine macaw, is a large parrot native to central and eastern South America. With a length (from the top of its head to the tip of its long pointed tail) of about one meter it is longer than any other species of parrot. It is the largest macaw and the largest flying parrot species. (Note: The flightless kākāpō of New Zealand outweighs it at up to 3.5 kg.) While generally easily recognized, it could be confused with the smaller Lear's macaw. Habitat loss and the trapping of wild birds for the pet trade have taken a heavy toll on their population in the wild, so the species is classified as Vulnerable on the International Union for Conservation of Nature's Red List, and it is protected by its listing on Appendix I of the Convention on International Trade in Endangered Species of Wild Fauna and Flora (CITES).

== Taxonomy ==
It is one of two extant and one probably extinct species of the South American macaw genus Anodorhynchus.

English physician, ornithologist, and artist John Latham first described the hyacinth macaw in 1790 under the binomial name Psittacus hyacinthinus. Tony Pittman in 2000 hypothesized that although the illustration in this work appears to be of an actual hyacinthine macaw, Latham's description of the length of the bird might mean he had measured a specimen of Lear's macaw instead. However, Latham's description was based on a taxidermic specimen, which was the only one Latham knew to exist up until 1822. It was prepared from a living animal originally belonging to Lord Orford, and given to the land agent Parkinson for display in the Leverian Museum after it died.

Nonetheless, Latham mentions another bird, which he calls the 'blue macaw', supposedly the same size. This blue macaw was already described in Latham's 1781 volume of his A general synopsis of birds as merely a variety of the blue and yellow macaw, and was previously figured in the work of Mathurin Jacques Brisson (1760), Patrick Browne (1756) and Eleazar Albin (1738) as a macaw found in Jamaica. Albin, Browne and Brisson all reference even older authors and state the bird also occurs on the mainland, and Albin states this bird is the female version of the scarlet macaw. Latham mentions that the provenance of parrots in general was often confused by the fact that the birds were much traded across the world for the purposes of sale.

== Description ==
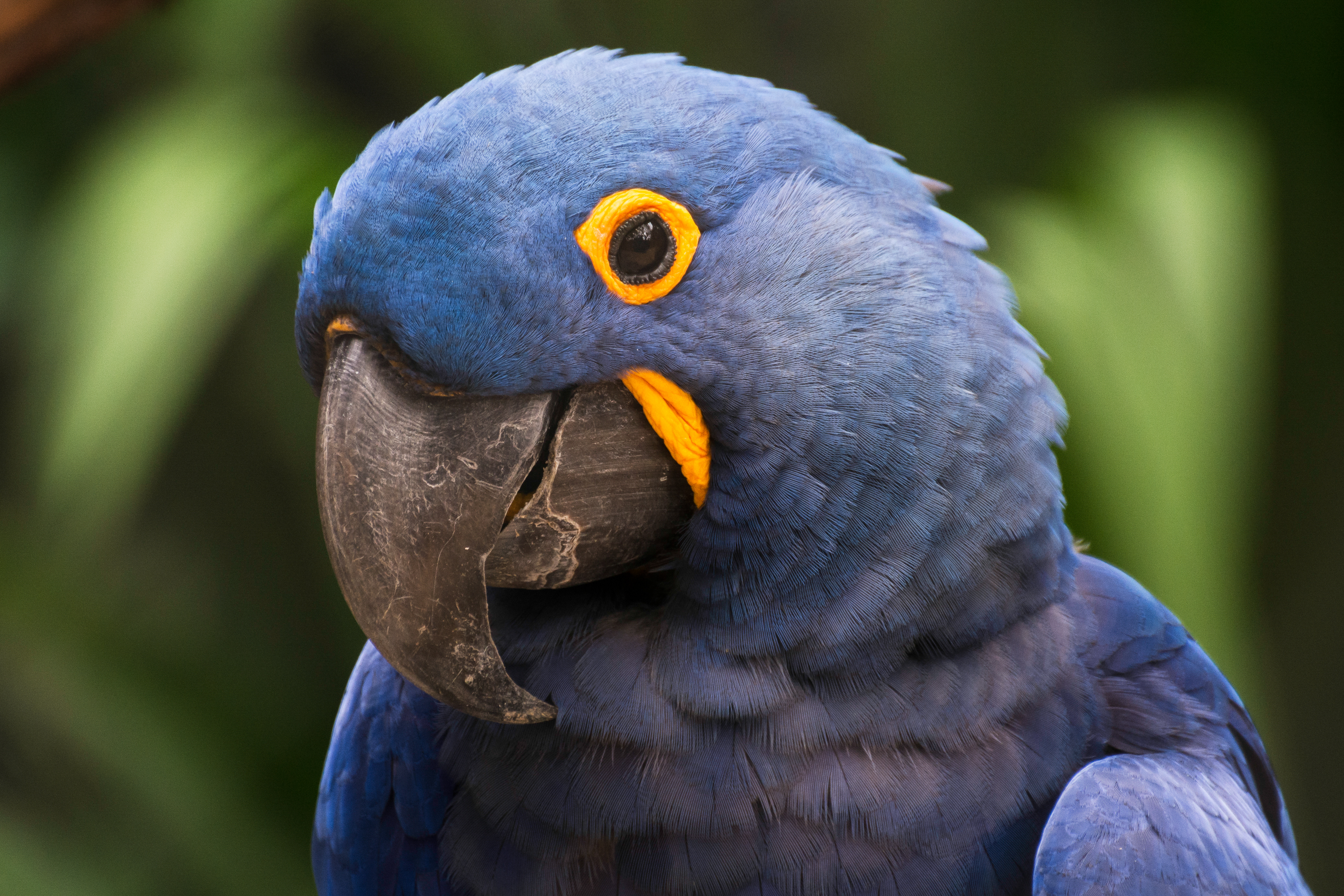
Close-up of the head

The largest parrot by length in the world, the hyacinth macaw is 1 m (3 ft 3 in) long from the tip of its tail to the top of its head and weighs 1.2–1.7 kg (2 lb 10 oz – 3 lb 12 oz). Each wing is 38.8–42.5 cm (15 1/4–16 3/4 in) long. The tail is long and pointed. Its feathers are mostly blue, lighter above, the neck feathers can sometimes be slightly grey, large parts of the underwing and undertail are black. The ring around the parrot's eyes and the area just underneath the beak are a strong, vibrant yellow.

== Ecology ==
The hyacinth macaw mostly nests in Manduvi trees, which rely on the toco toucan for 83% of the tree's distribution of seeds. The toco toucan also feeds on 53% of the hyacinth macaw's offspring as eggs. Eggs are also regularly preyed on by corvids such as jays and crows, opossums, skunks and coatis. The young are parasitized by larvae of flies of the genus Philornis.

== Behaviour ==
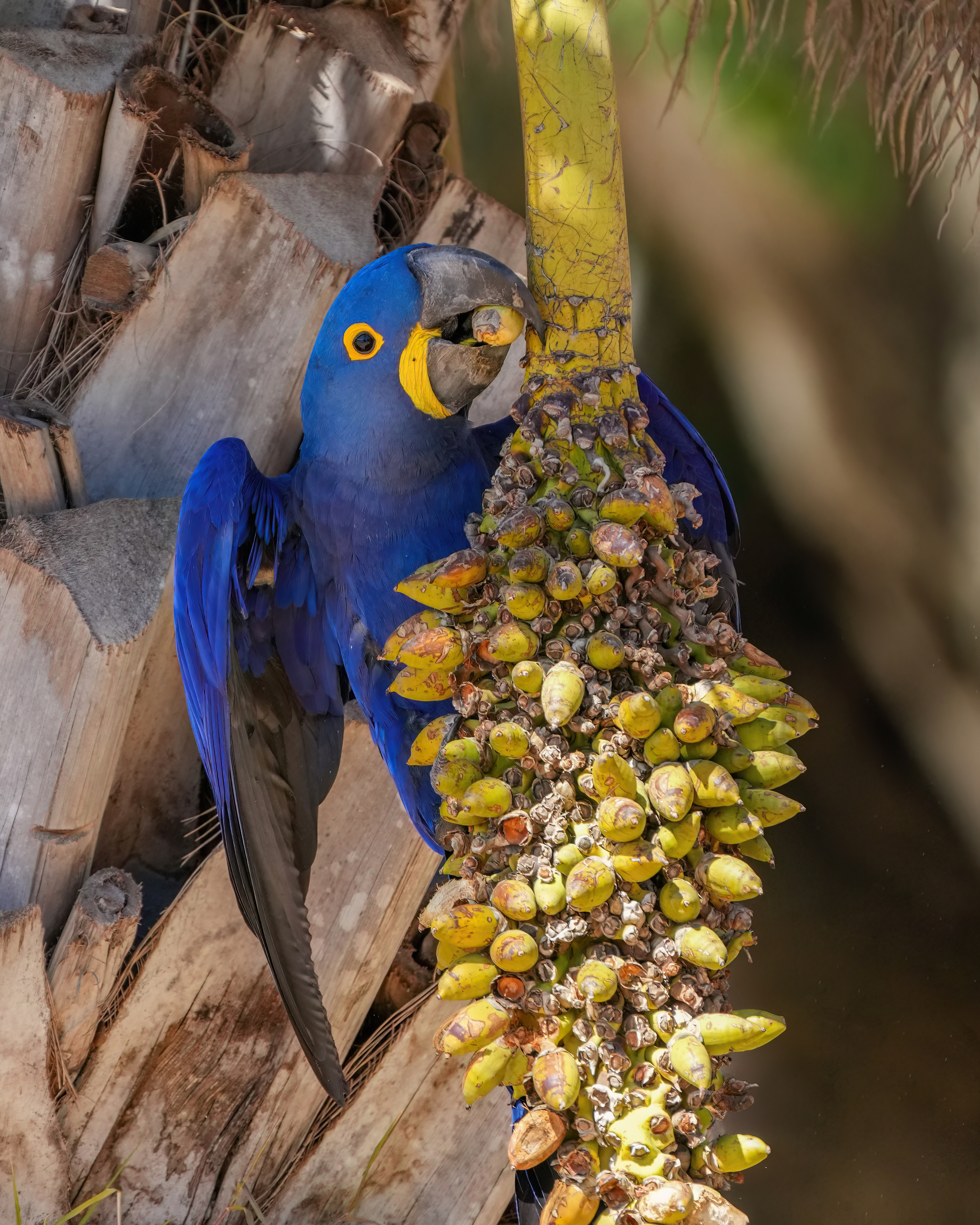
Acuri fruits compromise a large part of the hyacinth macaw's diet.

=== Diet ===
The majority of the hyacinth macaw diet is composed of nuts from specific palm species, such as the acuri and bocaiuva palms. In addition, they also eat fruits and other vegetable matter and will travel over a vast area to find the ripest foods. They have very strong beaks for eating the kernels of hard nuts and seeds. Their strong beaks are even able to crack coconuts, the large Brazil nut pods, and macadamia nuts. The birds also boast dry, smooth tongues with a bone inside them that makes them an effective tool for tapping into fruits. The acuri nut is so hard that the parrots cannot feed on it until it has passed through the digestive system of cattle.

In the Pantanal, hyacinth macaws feed almost exclusively on the nuts of Acrocomia aculeata and Attalea phalerata palm trees. This behaviour was recorded by the English naturalist Henry Walter Bates in his 1863 book The Naturalist on the River Amazons, where he wrote that

It flies in pairs, and feeds on the hard nuts of several palms, but especially of the Mucuja (Acrocomia lasiospatha). These nuts, which are so hard as to be difficult to break with a heavy hammer, are crushed to a pulp by the powerful beak of this macaw.

— Bates

Charles Darwin remarked on Bates's account of the species, calling it a "splendid bird" with its "enormous beak" able to feed on these palm nuts.

In captivity, the palm nuts native to the hyacinth macaw's natural habitat are often not readily available. In these circumstances the macadamia nut (which is native to Australia) is a suitable, nutritious and readily-accepted alternative. Coincidentally, the hyacinth macaw is one of the only birds with the necessary jaw strength to open the nut, which requires 300 psi of pressure to crack the shell.

=== Tool use ===
Limited tool use has been observed in both wild and captive hyacinth macaws. Reported sightings of tool use in wild parrots go as far back as 1863. Examples of tool use that have been observed usually involve a chewed leaf or pieces of wood. Macaws often incorporate these items when feeding on harder nuts. Their use allows the nuts the macaws eat to remain in position (prevent slipping) while they gnaw into it. It is not known whether this is learned social behavior or an innate trait, but observation on captive macaws shows that hand-raised macaws exhibit this behavior, as well. Comparisons showed that older macaws were able to open seeds more efficiently.

=== Reproduction ===
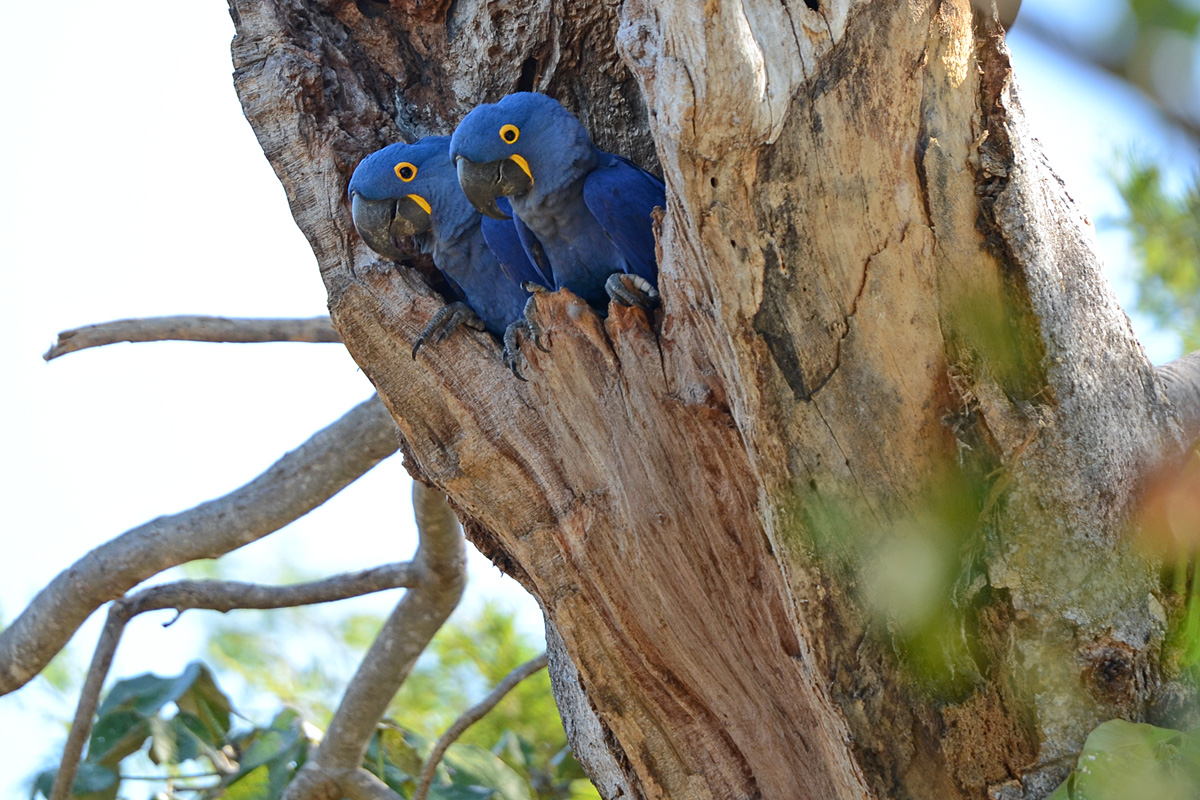
A pair in their nest

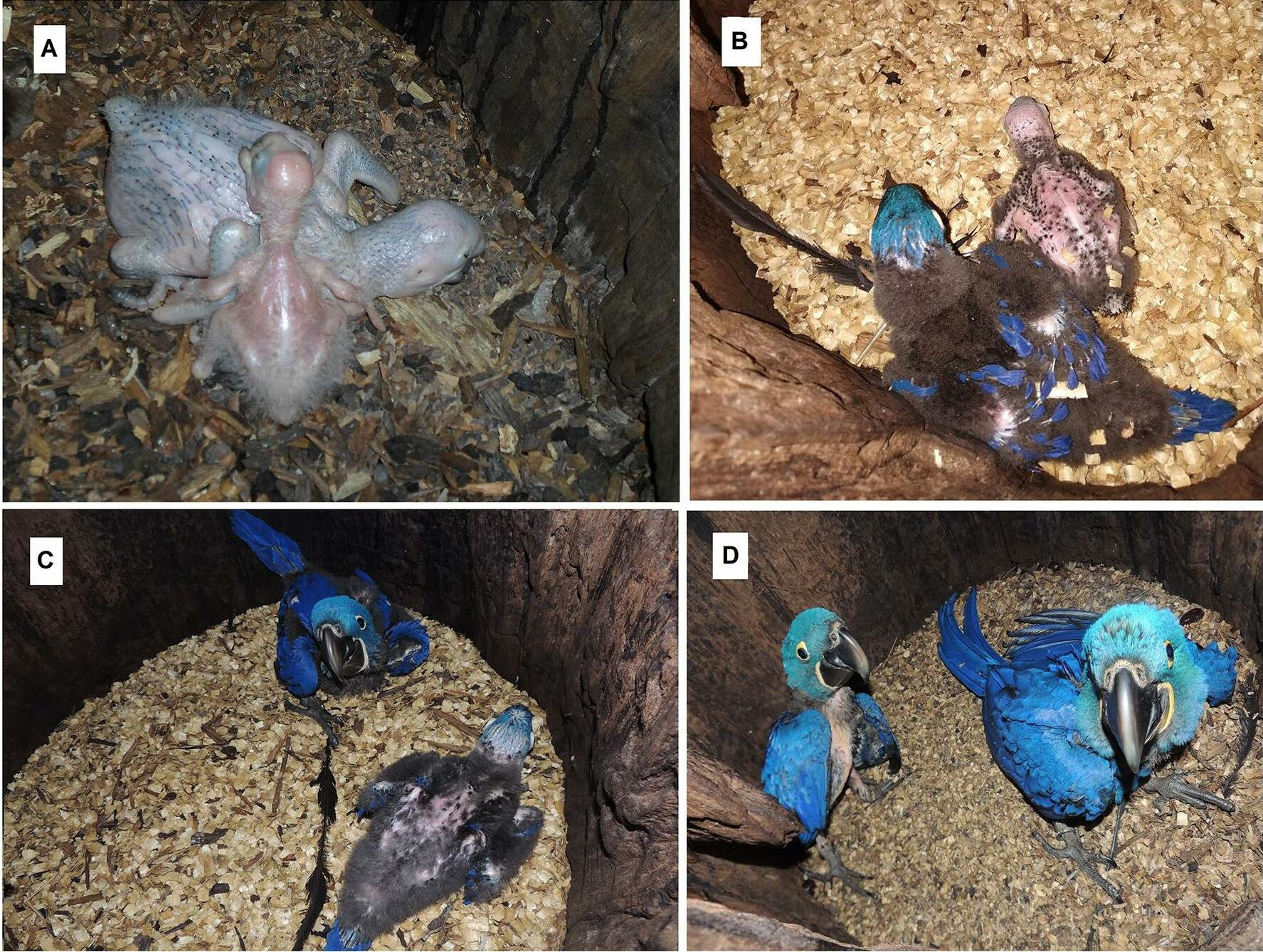
Development phases of the chicks: (A) nestling, 0–25 days, birds in picture are 17 and 18 days, respectively. Mass gain at this phase is slow, (B) chick, 26–77 days, birds in picture are 44 and 45 days, respectively, (C) chicks, birds in picture are 61 and 62 days, respectively. Geometric growth until maximum weight is attained, (D) juvenile, 78–107 days, birds in pictures are 104 and 105 days, respectively. Weight is maintained up to 90–95 days when weight loss begins with the first attempts of flying.

Nesting takes place between July and December, with nests constructed in tree cavities or cliff faces depending on the habitat. In the Pantanal region, 90% of nests are constructed in the manduvi tree (Sterculia apetala). The hyacinth macaw depends on the toucan for its livelihood. The toucan contributes largely to seed dispersal of the manduvi tree that the macaw needs for reproduction. However, the toucan is responsible for dispersing 83% of the seeds of Sterculia apetala, but also consumes 53% of eggs preyed. Hollows of sufficient size are only found in trees around 60 years of age or older, and competition is fierce. Existing holes are enlarged and then partially filled with wood chips. The clutch size is one or two eggs, although usually only one fledgling survives as the second egg hatches several days after the first, and the smaller fledgling cannot compete with the firstborn for food. A possible explanation for this behaviour is what is called the insurance hypothesis. The macaw lays more eggs than can be normally fledged to compensate for earlier eggs that failed to hatch or firstborn chicks that did not survive. The incubation period lasts about a month, and the male tends to his mate whilst she incubates the eggs. The chicks leave the nest, or fledge, around 110 days of age, and remain dependent on their parents until six months of age. They are mature and begin breeding at seven years of age.

== Distribution and habitat ==
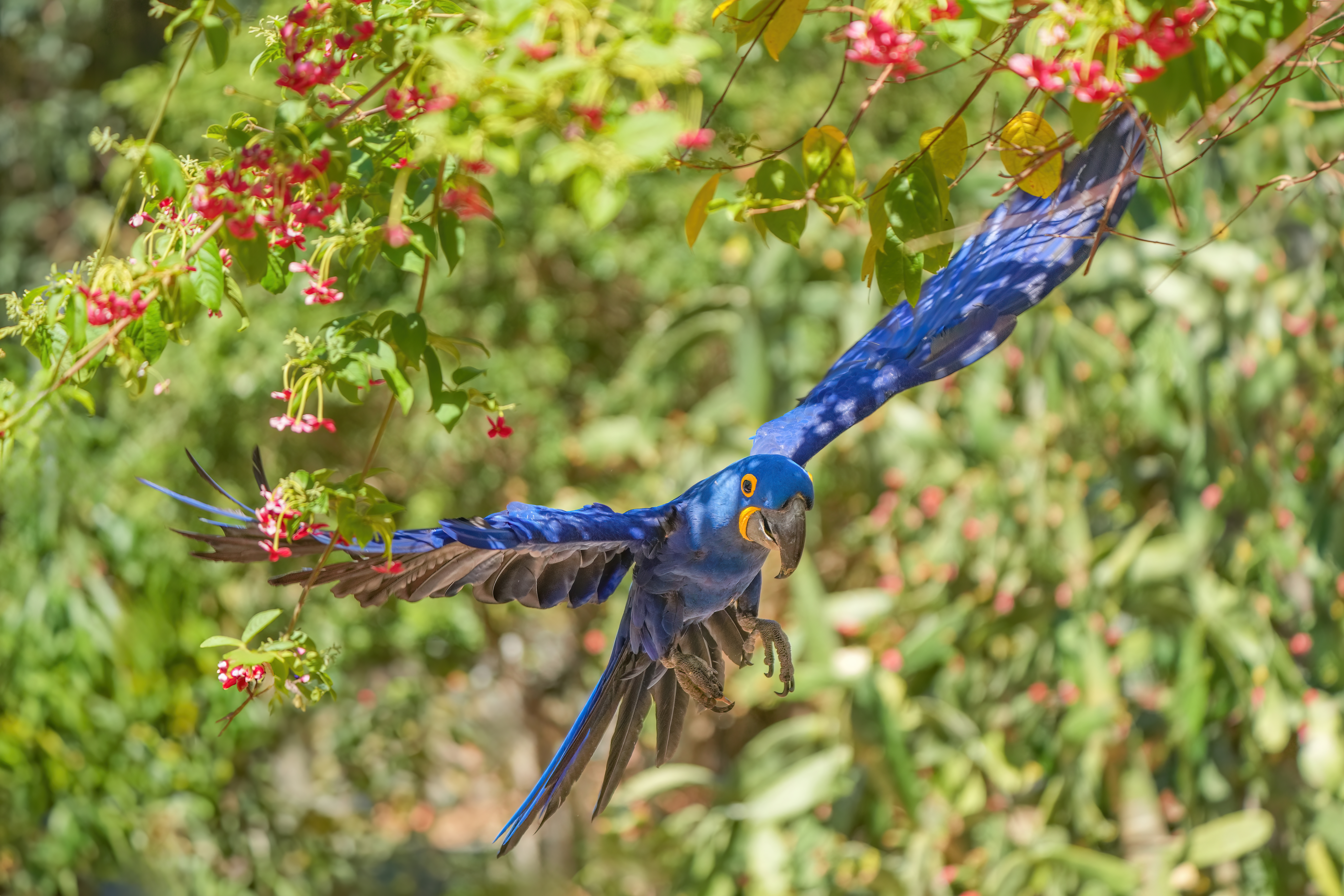
In flight in its natural habitat, Encontro das Águas State Park, Brazil

The hyacinth macaw occurs today in three main areas in South America: In the Pantanal region of Brazil, and adjacent eastern Bolivia and northeastern Paraguay, in the cerrado regions of the eastern interior of Brazil (Maranhão, Piauí, Bahia, Tocantins, Goiás, Mato Grosso, Mato Grosso do Sul, and Minas Gerais), and in the relatively open areas associated with the Tocantins River, Xingu River, Tapajós River, and the Marajó island in the eastern Amazon Basin of Brazil. Smaller, fragmented populations may occur in other areas.

Over the last few decades the known range in Bolivia has grown. It is well known from the far southeast of the country near the tri-national border point with Brazil and Paraguay, where it is considered an emblematic symbol of the region, and locals often feed the macaws maize, like chickens. In the early 1990s it became apparent the species also occurred in the remote Noel Kempff Mercado National Park area a few hundred kilometres northward. Most of the Bolivian population of this macaw is thought to be found in the San Matías Integrated Management Natural Area, an area with extensive pantanal (swamp). Censuses conducted in 2008, 2009, 2011 and 2014, revealed stable population numbers: respectively 231, 107, 134, and 166. Bird counts in such swampy and difficult to navigate terrain are inherently inadequate. The censuses were performed by visiting locations with previously reported sightings; however, it was not always possible to visit all sites, and coverage varied. Thus, in 2011 the earlier estimated population of about 300 birds in this area was considered to be largely accurate. A 2014 study which correlated sightings to habitat and extrapolated this over a larger area found the birds occur in the northern part of the Natural Area, and a similar population likely also occurs in an equally sized area to the north of this, outside of the Natural Area. In a 2018 Mongabay Latam article, park rangers relate that there is anecdotal evidence the population was increasing and spreading, as more sightings were being reported by local inhabitants and the bird was now confirmed for the first time in a number of adjacent municipalities.

The hyacinth macaw has escaped or been deliberately released into Florida, US, but there is no evidence that the population is breeding and may only persist due to continuing releases or escapes.

It prefers semi-open, somewhat wooded habitats. It usually avoids dense, humid forest, and in regions dominated by such habitats, it is generally restricted to the edge or relatively open sections (e.g. along major rivers). In different areas of their range, these parrots are found in savannah grasslands, in dry thorn forests known as caatinga, and in palm stands or swamps, particularly the moriche palm (Mauritia flexuosa).

A 2014 Bolivian study in San Matías Integrated Management Natural Area which correlated sightings to habitat found that areas including seasonally inundated savannas, wetlands and anthropogenic areas habitats interspersed with a mosaic of savannas, were the best indicators for the presence of the macaws. The most preferred habitat by far was anthropogenic, which is primarily cattle ranches practising extensive grazing in this area. The authors, however, were not very impressed by these results, and cautioned that the methodology might be flawed.

== Conservation and threats ==
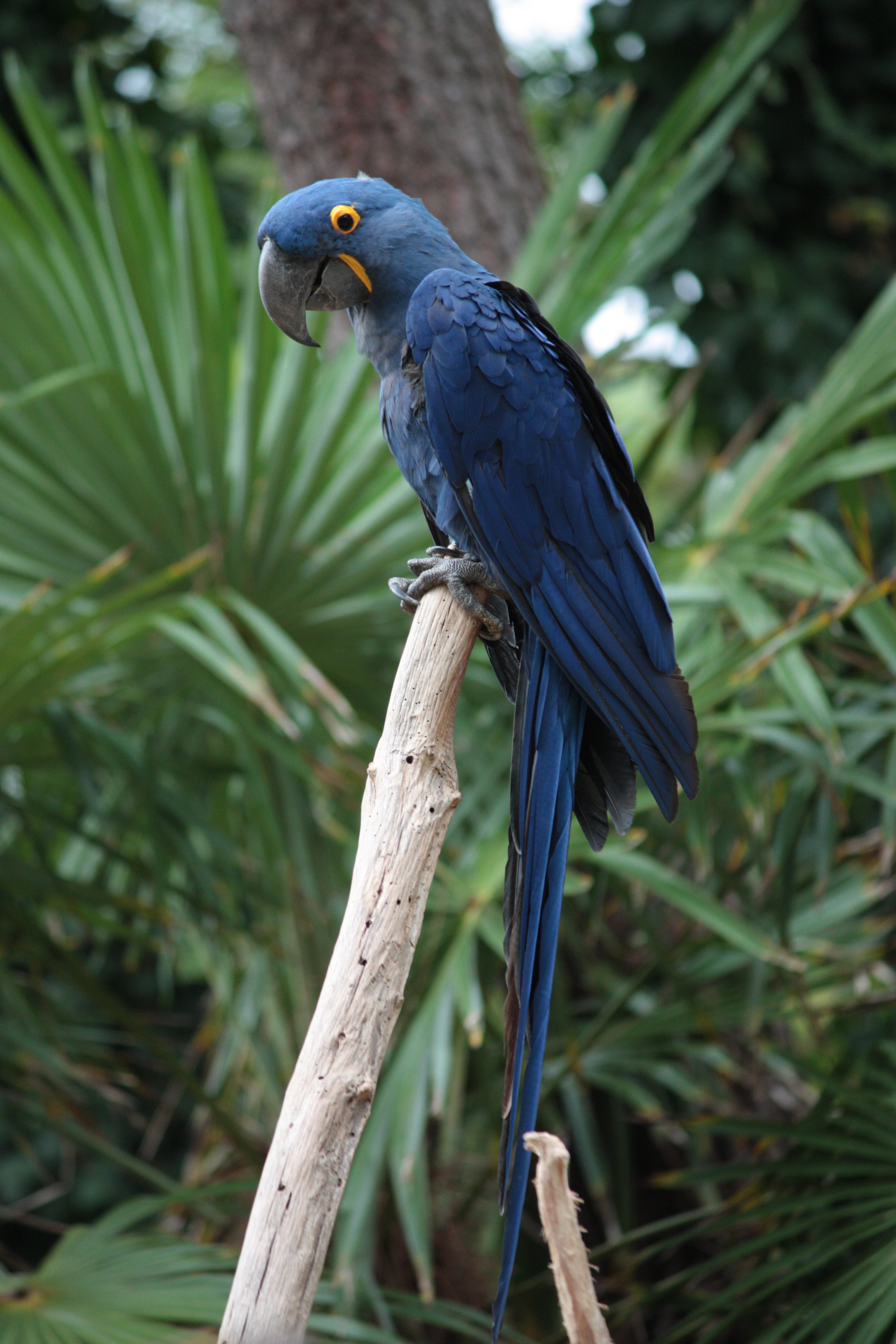
Captive macaw at La Palmyre Zoo, France

The conservation status of the hyacinth macaw is assessed as vulnerable. The first proper estimate of its total wild population was published by Munn in 1987 as 3,000 individuals, with a range of 2,500 to 5,000. Yamashita estimated the total world captive population as equal or slightly more than that in 1988. According to the World Wildlife Fund, as of 2004, an estimated 10,000 birds were taken from the wild in the 1980s, of which half were destined for the Brazilian market, and that the wild population had increased to 6,500.

The hyacinth macaw is protected by law in Brazil and Bolivia, and commercial export of wild sourced specimens is banned by its listing on Appendix I of the CITES. A number of long-term studies and conservation initiatives are in place; the Hyacinth Macaw Project in the Brazilian state of Mato Grosso do Sul has carried out important research by ringing individual birds, and has created a number of artificial nests to compensate for the small number of sites available in the region.

The Minnesota Zoo with BioBrasil and the World Wildlife Fund are involved in hyacinth macaw conservation.

On 3 July 2025, the hyacinth macaw was recognized as the symbolic bird of Mato Grosso do Sul after the approval of Law No. 6.442. According to the Hyacinth Macaw Project, this new recognition can help preserve the species and boost local tourism.

=== Threats ===
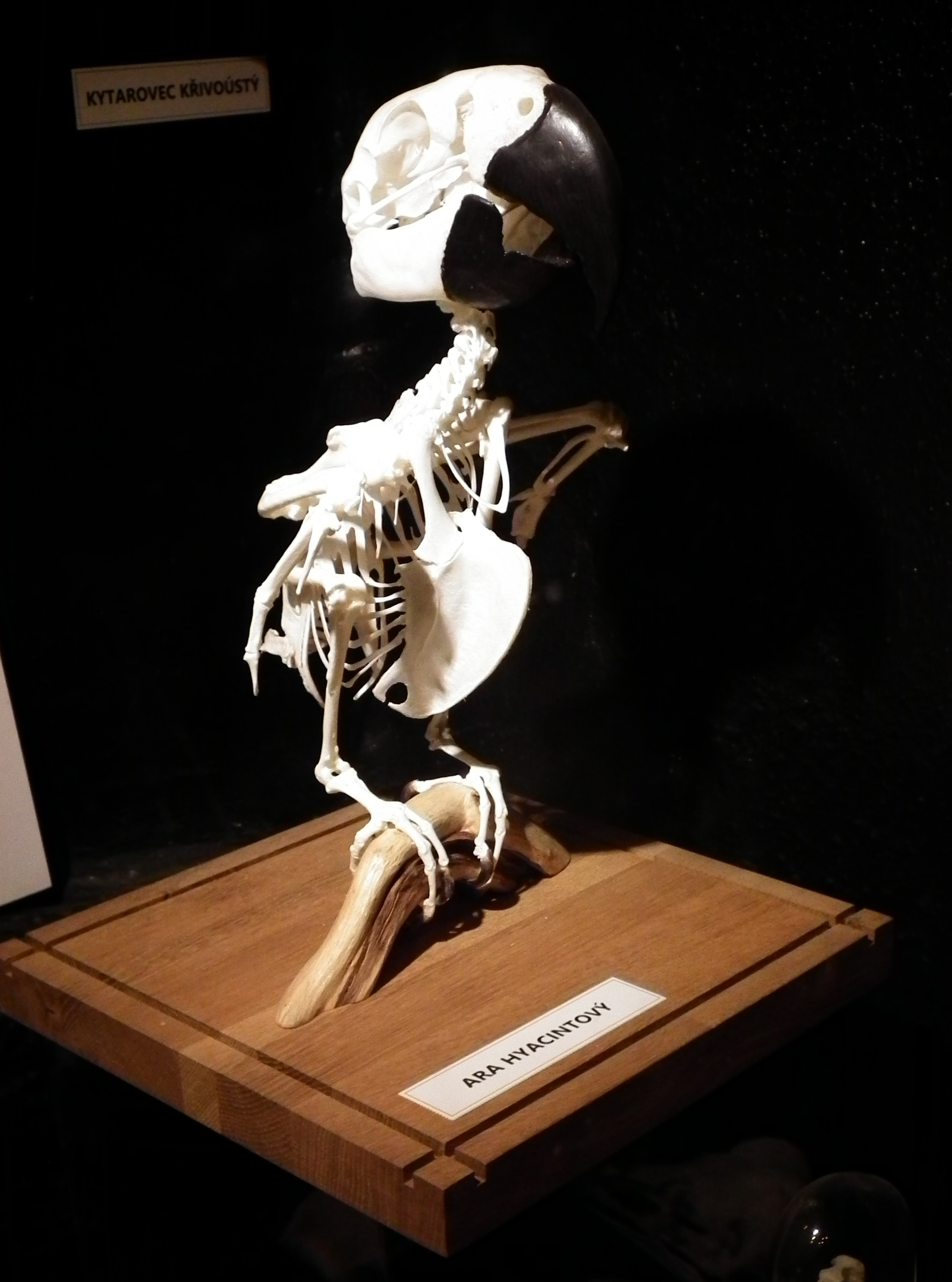
A skeleton exhibited at Dvůr Králové Zoo, Czech Republic

Throughout the macaw's range, habitat is being lost or altered due to the introduction of cattle ranching and mechanised agriculture, and the development of hydroelectric schemes. Annual grass fires set by farmers can destroy nest trees, and regions previously inhabited by this macaw are now unsuitable also due to agriculture and plantations. Locally, it has been hunted for food, and the Kayapo Indians of Gorotire in south-central Brazil use its feathers to make headdresses and other ornaments. While overall greatly reduced in numbers, it remains locally common in the Brazilian Pantanal, where many ranch-owners now protect the macaws on their land.

Parrots, as a whole, being of the family Psittacidae, are some of the most threatened birds in the world. This family has the most endangered species of all bird families, especially in the neotropics, the natural home of the hyacinth macaw, where 46 of 145 species are at a serious risk of global extinction. This species qualifies as 'Vulnerable' on the IUCN Red List because the population has suffered rapid reductions with the remaining threats of illegal trapping for the cage bird trade and habitat loss A few serious threats to the survival of the species in the Pantanal include human activities, mainly those resulting in habitat loss, the burning of land for pasture maintenance, and illegal trapping The exceptionally noisy, fearless, curious, sedentary, and predictable nature of this species, along with its specialization to only one or two species of palm in each part of its range, makes them especially vulnerable to capture, shooting, and habitat destruction. Because this species exclusively relies on the fruit produced by two palm species, if these species were to suffer due to disease or habitat destruction, it would put the parrot species at risk. This species specifically requires previously occupied holes within the Manduvi trees in order to nest, so nesting availability can be sparse. Furthermore, old growth of these trees, the youngest being 60 years, is required for the species to produce large enough holes to nest. This limits future potential for reproduction if these trees are destroyed or competition with other species for space is increased.

Although the species has low genetic variability, it does not necessarily pose a threat to their survival. This genetic structure accentuates the need for protection of hyacinth macaws from different regions to maintain their genetic diversity. If populations and genetic diversity continue to decrease, it could become a major conservation issue in the future. A smaller population of hyacinth macaws will increase the influence of genetic drift, and, therefore, increase the risk of extinction. A lower genetic variation could send populations into an extinction vortex. Nevertheless, the most important factors negatively affecting wild populations prove to be habitat destruction and nest poaching.

In the Pantanal, habitat loss is largely contributed to the creations of pastures for cattle, while in many other regions, it is the result of clearing land for colonization. Similarly, large areas of habitat in Amazonia have been lost for cattle ranching and hydroelectric power schemes on the Tocantins and Xingu Rivers. Many young manduvi trees are then being grazed on by cattle or burnt by fire, and the Gerias is speedily being converted to land for mechanized agriculture, cattle ranching, and exotic tree plantations. Annual grass fires set by farmers destroy a number of nest trees, and the rise of agriculture and plantations has made habitats formerly populated by the macaws unsuitable to maintain their livelihoods. Moreover, an increase in commercial demand for feather art by the Kayapo Indians threatens the species, as up to 10 macaws are needed to make a single headdress.

In the case of macaws being taken from their natural environment, a variety of factors alter their health such as inadequate hygiene conditions, feeding, and overpopulation during the illegal practice of pet trade. Once birds are captured and brought into captivity, their mortality rates can become very high. Records reveal a Paraguayan dealer receiving 300 unfeathered young in 1972, with all but three perishing. Due to poor survival rates of the young, poachers concentrate more heavily on adult birds, which depletes the population at a rapid pace.

According to Article 111 of Bolivian Environmental Law #1333, all persons involved in the trade, capture, and transportation without authorization of wild animals will suffer a two-year prison sentence, along with a fine equivalent to 100% of the value of the animal. While many trackers have been arrested, the illegal pet trade still largely continues in Santa Cruz, Bolivia. Unfortunately, animal trafficking is not necessarily viewed as a priority in the city, leaving national departmental and municipal governments unwilling to halt the trade in city centers, and local police reluctant to get involved. This ideology has in turn resulted in a lack of enforcement regarding trade in both CITES-restricted species and threatened species, with little to no restrictions regarding humane treatment of the animals, disease control, or proper hygiene. In the trade centers, the hyacinth macaw demanded the highest price of US$1,000, proving it to be a very desirable and valued bird in the pet trade industry.

=== Conservation efforts ===
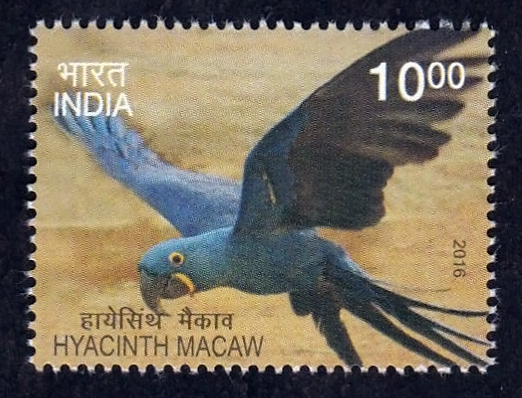
In flight on an Indian postage stamp

In 1989, the European Endangered Species Programme for the hyacinth macaw was founded as a result of concerns about the status of the wild population and the lack of successful breeding in captivity. Breeding in captivity still remains difficult, being that hand-reared hyacinth macaw offspring have been demonstrated to have higher mortality rates, especially within the first month of life. Additionally, they have a higher incidence of acute crop stasis than other macaw species due, in part, to their specific dietary requirements. The hyacinth macaw is protected by law in Brazil and Bolivia, and international trade is prohibited by its listing on Appendix I of the CITES. Appendix I has banned exporting the bird in all countries of origin, and several studies and conservational initiatives have been taken. The Hyacinth Macaw Project in the Caiman Ecological Refuge, located in the Pantanal, has employed artificial nests and chick management techniques, along with effectively raising awareness among cattle ranchers. Many ranch owners in the Pantanal and Gerais, to protect the birds, no longer allow trappers on their properties.

A number of conservation actions have been proposed, including the study of the current range, population status, and extent of trading in different parts of its range. Additionally, propositions have been made to assess the effectiveness of artificial nest boxes, enforce legal measures preventing trade, and experiment with ecotourism at one or two sites to encourage donors. Furthermore, the Hyacinth Macaw Project in Mato Grosso do Sul has carried out important research by ringing individual birds and has created a number of artificial nests to compensate for the small number of sites available in the region. Furthermore, proposals to list the species as Endangered under the US Endangered Species Act have been made to further protective measures in the US and to create Bolivian and Paraguayan trade management authorities under presidential control.

=== Long-term prospects ===
Each of the three main populations should be managed as a separate biological entity so as to avoid numbers dropping below 500. While the birds may be in decline in the wild, notably higher populations of captive macaws are being held in zoos and private collections. If success in managing and replanting the macaw's food trees and erecting nest boxes as an experiment in the Pantanals is seen, the species could survive. Survival rates could also be enhanced if ranch owners would leave all large and potential nest trees standing and eliminate all trapping on their properties. Ultimately, should these factors work in tandem with the erection of nest boxes, the fencing off certain saplings, and the planting of others, the long-term prospects of the hyacinth macaw species would be greatly improved.

== As pets ==
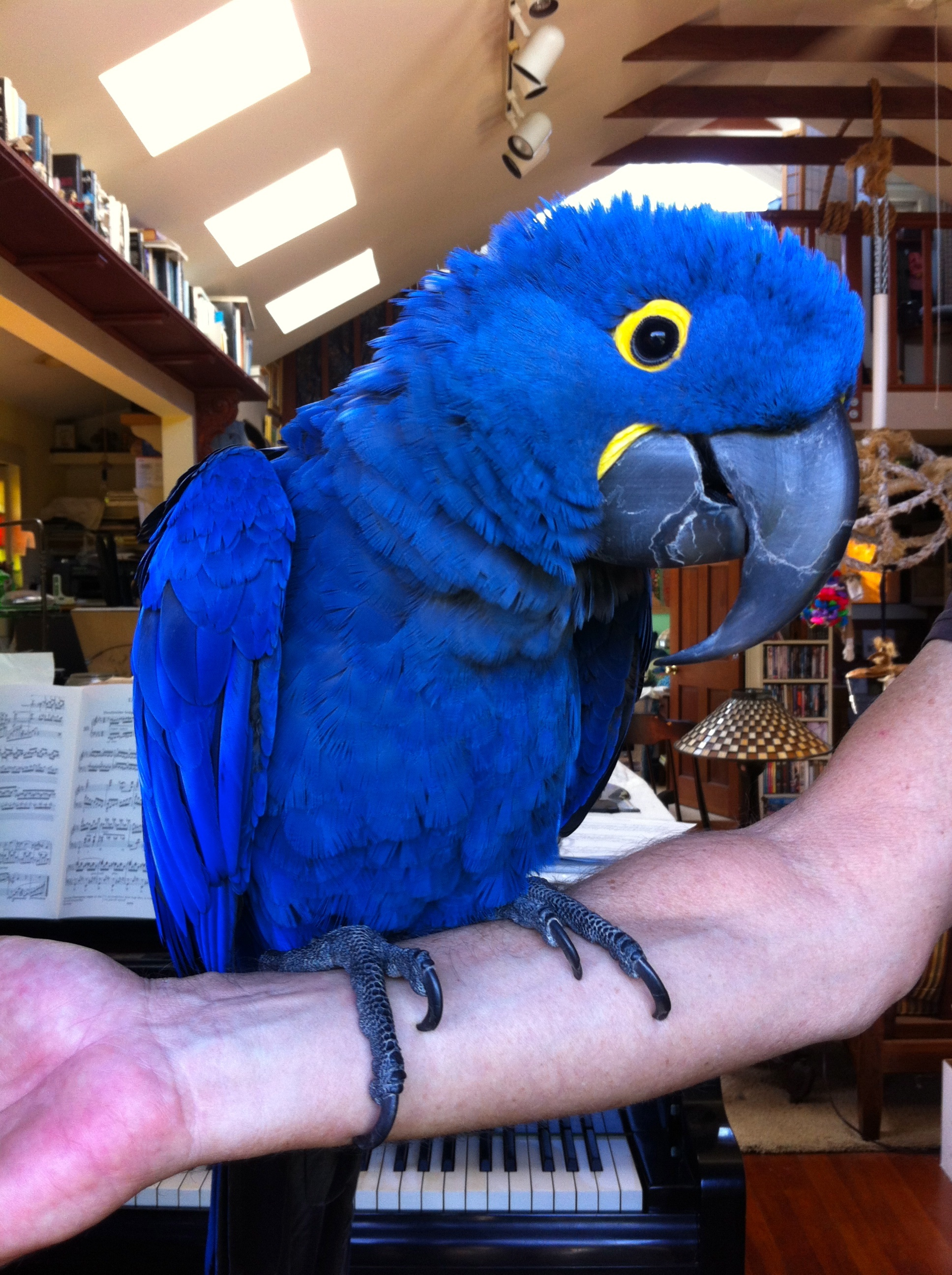
A pet hyacinth macaw

The hyacinth macaw is sometimes kept as a companion parrot. Not recommended for novice bird-keepers, this bird requires large amounts of space, regular exercise and a custom-built stainless steel cage, as its powerful beak can easily destroy most commercially available parrot cages. In order to remain healthy, the species requires regular social interaction and play with humans or other birds. This large macaw, like most parrots, has a natural inclination to chew objects and due to its physical size and strength, can cause considerable damage. It is recommended that an entire room of the owner's home be set aside for use by the bird, which should be provided with plenty of safe, destroyable wooden and leather objects to keep it amused. It is also a very expensive pet: US$10,000 is not an uncommon price for a young hyacinth macaw. The World Parrot Trust recommends that the hyacinth macaw not be kept permanently indoors and that it should have access to an enclosure of at least 15 m (50 ft) for part of the year. An attending veterinarian must be aware of specific nutritional needs and pharmacologic sensitivities when dealing with them. Possibly due to genetic factors or captive rearing limitations, this species can become neurotic/phobic, which is problematic.

They are even-tempered and can be calmer than other macaws, being known as "gentle giants". It is not generally an aggressive bird and it appears to enjoy interacting playfully with humans. It can cause bite injuries simply by playfully "mouthing" its owner, however, and this behavior should be discouraged with training begun when the bird is young.

The hyacinth macaw can learn to talk, but it is not as gifted in that area as some other species. Nonetheless, it is an intelligent bird that may learn to use words and phrases in the correct context. It can live for over 50 years in captivity.

== See also ==
- List of macaws
- List of Vulnerable birds
