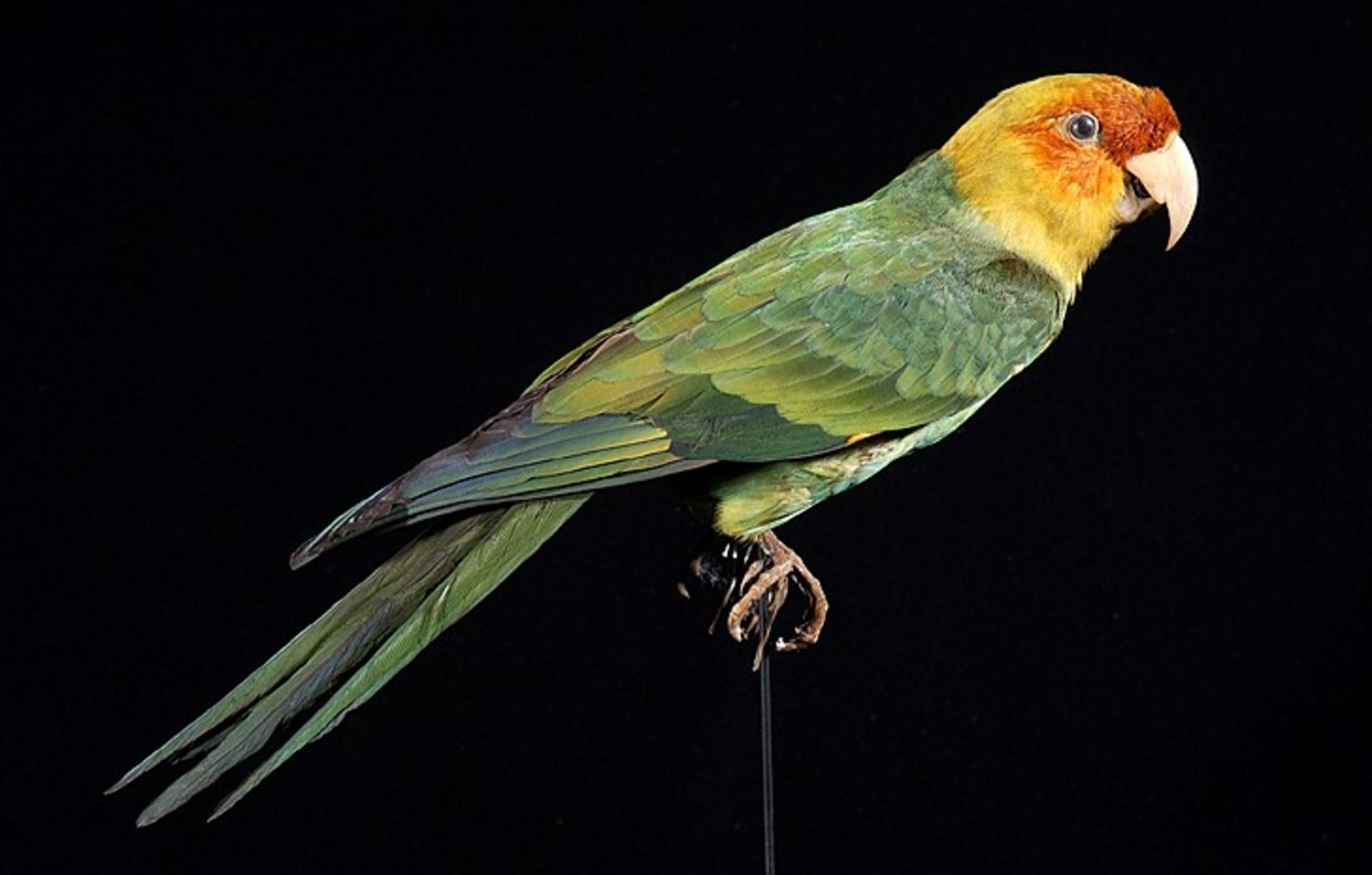
- Mounted specimen in the Naturalis Biodiversity Center

Conservation status
- Extinct (1918) (IUCN 3.1)

- Presumed Extinct (1918) (NatureServe)

Scientific classification
- Kingdom: Animalia
- Phylum: Chordata
- Class: Aves
- Order: Psittaciformes
- Family: Psittacidae
- Tribe: Arini
- Genus: †Conuropsis; Salvadori, 1891
- Species: †C. carolinensis

Binomial name
- †Conuropsis carolinensis (Linnaeus, 1758)

Subspecies
- C. c. carolinensis C. c. ludovicianus
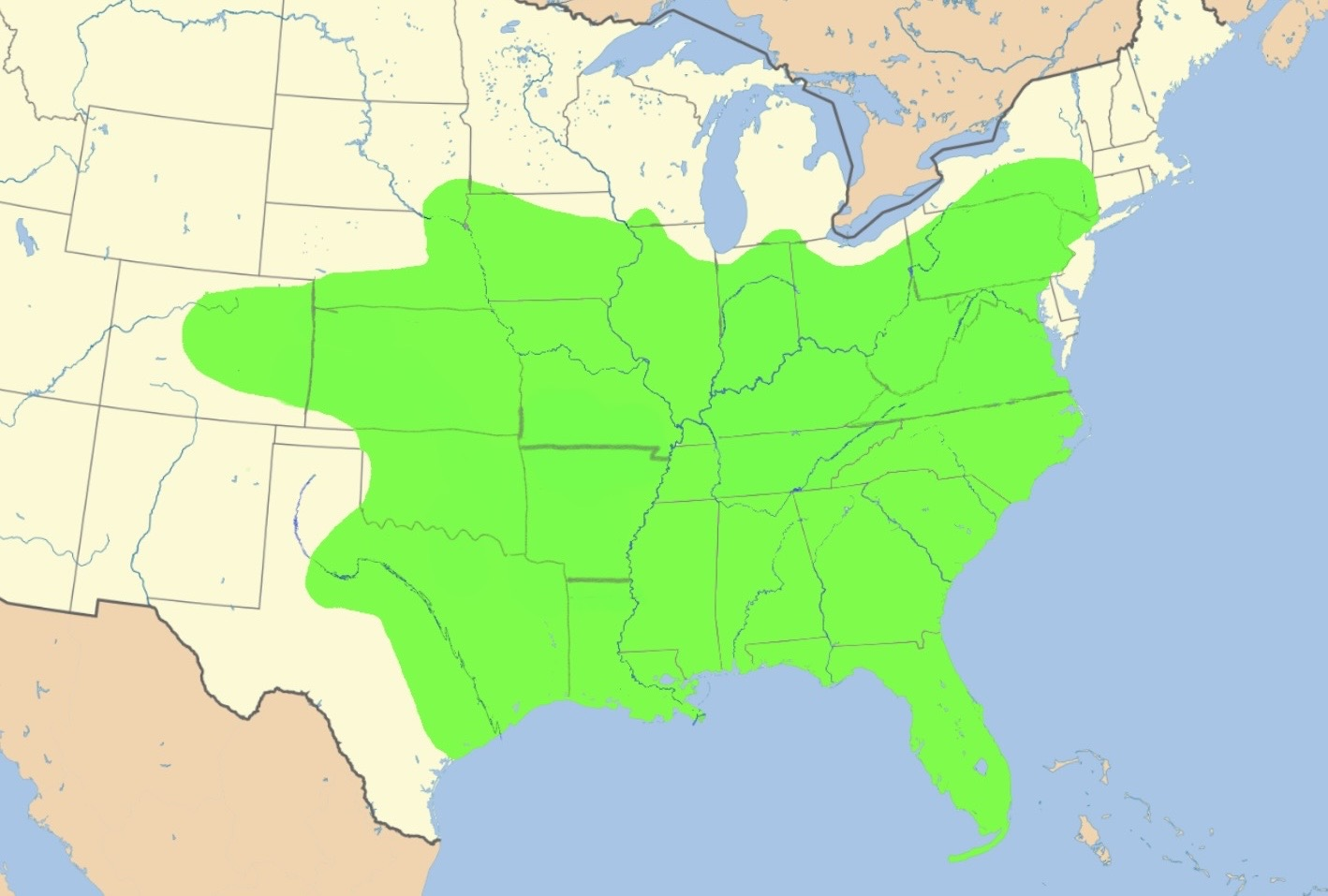
- The Carolina parakeet's historic range (1891)

Synonyms
- Psittacus carolinensis Linnaeus, 1758; Conurus carolinensis Lesson, 1831

= Carolina parakeet =

Extinct species of parakeet

The Carolina parakeet (Conuropsis carolinensis), or Carolina conure, is an extinct species of small green neotropical parrot with a bright yellow head, reddish orange face, and pale beak that was native to the Eastern, Midwest, and Plains States of the United States. It was the only indigenous parrot within its range, and one of only three parrot species native to the United States. The others are the thick-billed parrot, now extirpated; and the green parakeet, still present in Texas. A fourth parrot species, the red-crowned amazon, is debated.

The Carolina parakeet was called maskowhinge in Powhatan, puzzi la née ("head of yellow") or pot pot chee by the Seminole and kelinky in Chickasaw. Though formerly prevalent within its range, the bird had become rare by the middle of the 19th century. The last confirmed sighting in the wild was of the C. c. ludovicianus subspecies in 1910. The last known specimen, a male named Incas, perished in captivity at the Cincinnati Zoo in 1918, and the species was declared extinct in 1939.

The earliest reference to these parrots was in 1583 in Florida reported by Sir George Peckham in A True Report of the Late Discoveries of the Newfound Lands of expeditions conducted by English explorer Sir Humphrey Gilbert, who notes that explorers in North America "doe testifie that they have found in those countryes; ... parrots". They were first scientifically described in English naturalist Mark Catesby's two-volume Natural History of Carolina, Florida and the Bahama Islands published in London in 1731 and 1743.

Carolina parakeets were probably poisonous – French-American naturalist and painter John J. Audubon noted that cats apparently died from eating them, and they are known to have eaten the toxic seeds of cockleburs.

== Taxonomy ==
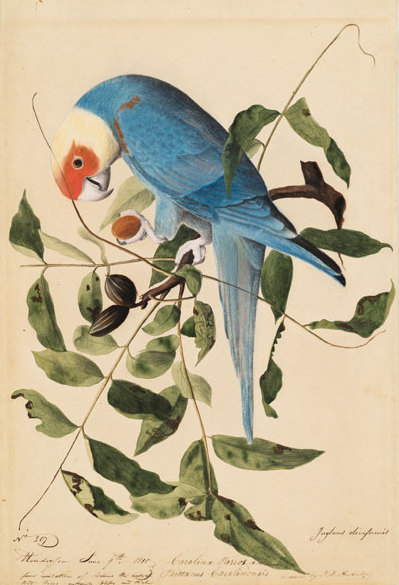
C. c. ludovicianus by John James Audubon

Carolinensis is a species of the genus Conuropsis, one of numerous genera of New World Neotropical parrots in family Psittacidae of true parrots.

The binomial Psittacus carolinensis was assigned by Swedish zoologist Carl Linnaeus in the 10th edition of Systema Naturae published in 1758. The species was given its own genus, Conuropsis, by Italian zoologist and ornithologist Tommaso Salvadori in 1891 in his Catalogue of the Birds in the British Museum, volume 20. The name is derived from the Greek-ified conure ("parrot of the genus Conurus" an obsolete name of genus Aratinga) + -opsis ("likeness of") and Latinized Carolina (from Carolana, an English colonial province (Note: A reference to the 17th century English province of Carolana, called Florida by the Spaniards and La Louisiane by the French, a grant from King Charles I, which included the territory extending from the Atlantic Ocean to New Mexico, between the 30th and 36th parallels of latitude, which encompasses on the Atlantic Seaboard the modern states of North and South Carolina)) + -ensis (of or "from a place"), therefore a bird "like a conure from Carolina".

Two subspecies are recognized: The Louisiana subspecies of the Carolina parakeet, C. c. ludovicianus, (Note: ludovicianus, Latinized "of Louisiana", a reference to the Louisiana Territory of the early 19th century, which does not include the modern state of Louisiana.) was slightly different in color from the nominate subspecies, being more bluish-green and generally of a somewhat subdued coloration, and became extinct in much the same way, but at a somewhat earlier date (early 1910s). The Appalachian Mountains separated these birds from the eastern C. c. carolinensis.

=== Evolution ===
According to a study of mitochondrial DNA recovered from museum specimens, their closest living relatives include some of the South American Aratinga parakeets: The Nanday parakeet, the sun conure, and the golden-capped parakeet. The authors note the bright yellow and orange plumage and blue wing feathers found in C. carolinensis are traits shared by another species, the jandaya parakeet (A. jandaya), that was not sampled in the study, but is generally thought to be closely related. (Note: Sun parakeet, golden-capped parakeet and jenday parakeet together with sulphur-breasted parakeet are collectively referred to as the Aratinga solstitialis complex; they are so closely related that they are considered by some authorities to be subspecies of A. solstitialis.) To help resolve the divergence time, a whole genome of a preserved specimen has now been sequenced. The Carolina parakeet colonized North America about 5.5 million years ago. This was well before North America and South America were joined by the formation of the Panama land bridge about 3.5 mya. Since the Carolina parakeets' more distant relations are geographically closer to its own historic range while its closest relatives are more geographically distant to it, these data are consistent with the generally accepted hypothesis that Central and North America were colonized at different times by distinct lineages of parrots – parrots that originally invaded South America from Antarctica some time after the breakup of Gondwana, where Neotropical parrots originated approximately 50 mya.

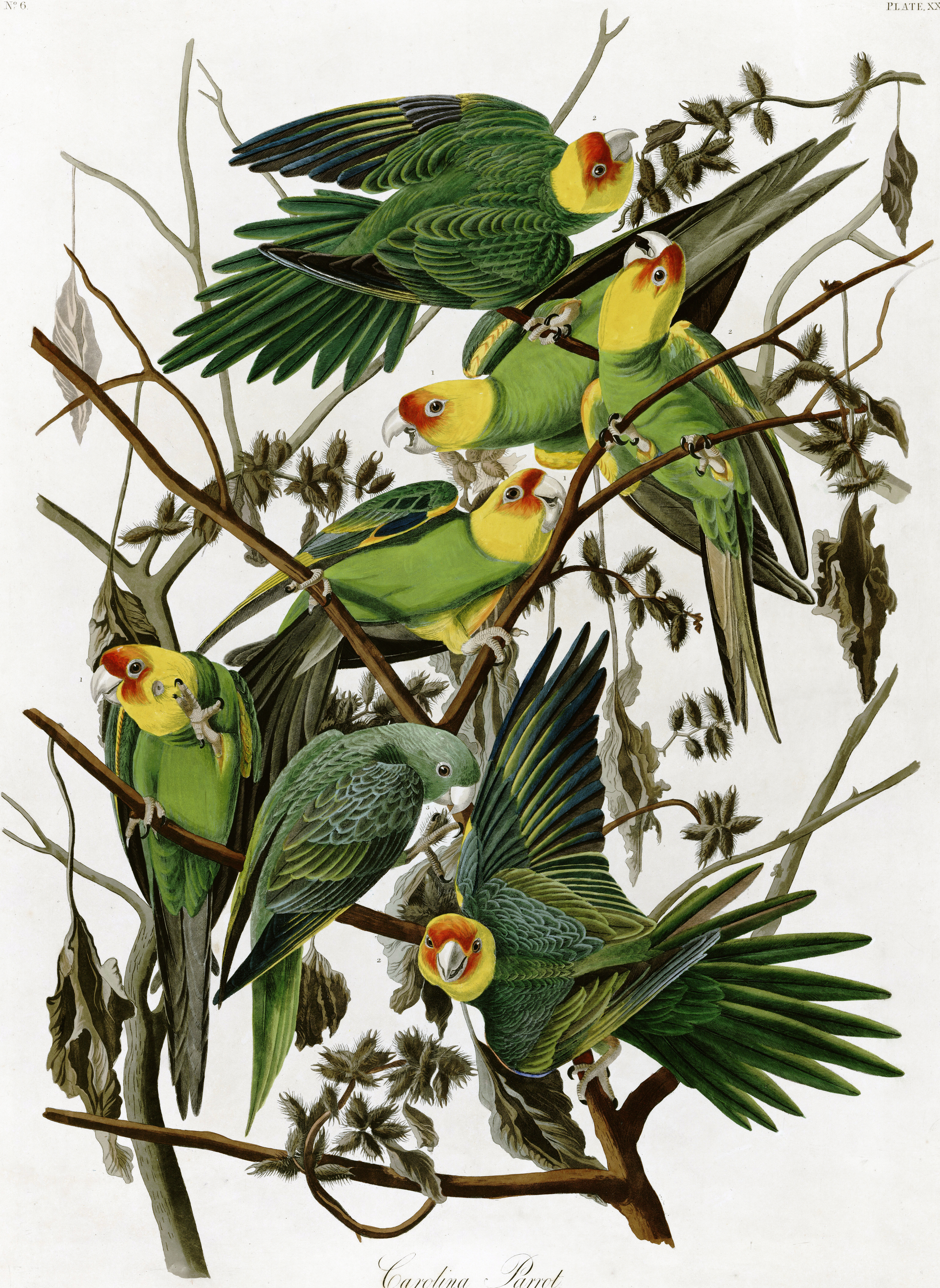
Illustration by John James Audubon

The following cladogram shows the placement of the Carolina parakeet among its closest relatives, after a DNA study by Kirchman et al. (2012):

- Arini
  - - Cyanopsitta spixii (Spix's macaw)
    - - Orthopsittaca (red-bellied macaw)
      - - - Primolius (contains three species)
        - Ara
          - Ara macao (scarlet macaw)
          - Ara glaucogularis (blue-throated macaw)
  - - - †Conuropsis carolinensis (Carolina parakeet)
    - Aratinga
      - - Aratinga nenday (Nanday parakeet)
      - - Aratinga solstitialis (sun conure)
        - Aratinga auricapillus (golden-capped parakeet)

A fossil parrot, designated Conuropsis fratercula, was described based on a single humerus from the Miocene Sheep Creek Formation (possibly late Hemingfordian, c. 16 mya, possibly later) of Snake River, Nebraska. It was a smaller bird, three-quarters the size of the Carolina parakeet. "The present species is of peculiar interest as it represents the first known parrot-like bird to be described as a fossil from North America." (Wetmore 1926; italics added) However, it is not completely certain that the species is correctly assigned to Conuropsis.

== Description ==
Turnaround video of a C. c. carolinensis specimen at Naturalis Biodiversity Center

The Carolina parakeet was a small, green parrot very similar in size and coloration to the extant jenday parakeet and sun conure – the sun conure being its closest living relative.

The majority of the parakeets' plumage was green with lighter green underparts, a bright yellow head and orange forehead and face extending to behind the eyes and upper cheeks (lores). The shoulders were yellow, continuing down the outer edge of the wings. The primary feathers were mostly green, but with yellow edges on the outer primaries. Thighs were green towards the top and yellow towards the feet. Male and female adults were identical in plumage, however males were slightly larger than females (sexually dimorphic only in size). Their legs and feet were light brown. They share the zygodactyl feet common to all the parrot family. Their eyes were ringed by white skin and their beaks were pale flesh colored. These birds weigh about 3.5 oz., (Note: A notable conflict exists over the weight of this bird, with most references reporting 280 g (about 10 oz), but that would make the bird an improbable 2.5 times as heavy as the similarly sized, closely related Nanday parakeet, whose weight is given as 100–140 g (3.5–4.9 oz)) are 13 in. long, and have wingspans of 21–23 in.

Young Carolina parakeets differed slightly in coloration from adults. The face and entire body were green, with paler underparts. They lacked yellow or orange plumage on the face, wings, and thighs. Hatchlings were covered in mouse-gray down, until about 39–40 days old, when green wings and tails appeared. Fledglings had full adult plumage around 1 year of age.

These birds were fairly long-lived, at least in captivity: A pair was kept at the Cincinnati Zoo for over 35 years.

== Distribution and habitat ==
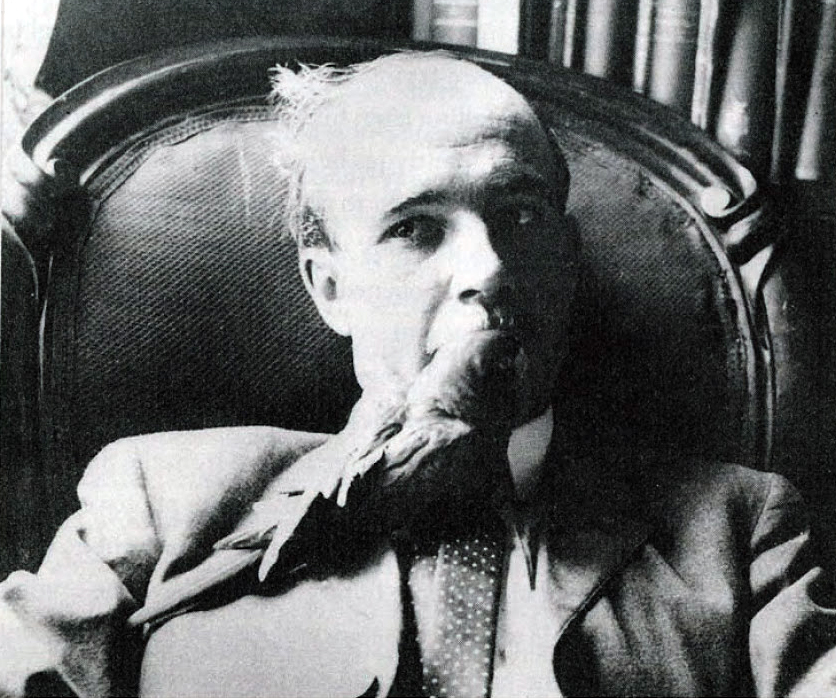
Photo of a live pet specimen, 1906

The Carolina parakeet had the northernmost range of any known parrot. It was found from southern New York and Wisconsin to Kentucky, Tennessee, and the Gulf of Mexico, from the Atlantic Seaboard to as far west as eastern Colorado. It lived in old-growth forests along rivers and in swamps. Its range was described by early explorers thus: the 43rd parallel as the northern limit, the 26th as the most southern, the 73rd and 106th meridians as the eastern and western boundaries, respectively, the range included all or portions of at least 28 states. (Note: Alabama, Arkansas, Colorado, Florida, Georgia, Illinois, Indiana, Iowa, Kansas, Kentucky, Louisiana, Maryland, Mississippi, Missouri, Nebraska, New Jersey, New York, N. Carolina, Ohio, Oklahoma, Pennsylvania, S. Carolina, S. Dakota, Tennessee, Texas, Virginia, W. Virginia, Wisconsin) Its habitats were old-growth wetland forests along rivers and in swamps, especially in the Mississippi–Missouri drainage basin, with large hollow trees including cypress and sycamore to use as roosting and nesting sites.

Only very rough estimates of the birds' former prevalence can be made, with an estimated range of 20,000 to 2.5 million km^{2}, and population density of 0.5 to 2.0 parrots per km^{2}, population estimates range from tens of thousands to a few million birds (though the densest populations occurred in Florida covering 170,000 km^{2}, so hundreds of thousands of the birds may have been in that state alone).

The species may have appeared as a very rare vagrant in places as far north as southern Ontario in Canada. A few bones, including a pygostyle, found at the Calvert Site in southern Ontario came from the Carolina parakeet. The possibility remains open that this specimen was taken there for ceremonial purposes.

== Behavior and diet ==
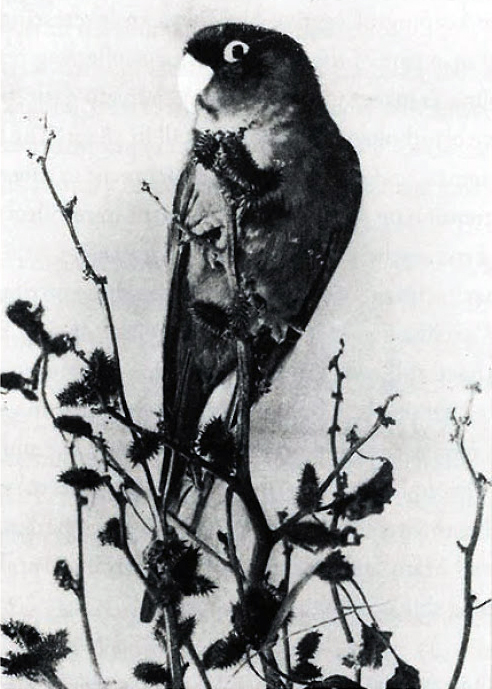
This live captive bird was photographed by Robert Wilson Shufeldt around 1900.

The bird lived in huge, noisy flocks of as many as 300 birds. It built its nest in a hollow tree, laying two to five (most accounts say two) 1.6 in (4.1 cm) round white eggs. Reportedly, multiple female parakeets could deposit their eggs into one nest, similar to nesting behavior described in the monk parakeet (Myiopsitta monachus).

It mostly ate the seeds of forest trees and shrubs, including those of cypress, hackberry, beech, sycamore, elm, pine, maple, oak, and other plants such as thistles and sandspurs (Cenchrus species). It ate fruits, including apples, grapes, and figs (often from orchards by the time of its decline), and flower buds, and occasionally, insects. It was especially noted for its predilection for cockleburs (Xanthium strumarium), a plant which contains a toxic glucoside, and it was considered to be an agricultural pest of grain crops.

== Extinction ==
Turnaround video of a C. c. ludovicianus specimen, Naturalis

The last captive Carolina parakeet, Incas, died at the Cincinnati Zoo on February 21, 1918, in the same cage as Martha, the last passenger pigeon, which died earlier on September 1, 1914. There are no scientific studies or surveys of this bird by American naturalists; most information about it is from anecdotal accounts and museum specimens, so details of its prevalence and decline are unverified or speculative.

Extensive accounts of the precolonial and early colonial have been given for prevalence of this bird. The existence of flocks of gregarious, very colorful and raucous parrots could hardly have gone unnoted by European explorers, as parrots were virtually unknown in seafaring European nations in the 16th and 17th centuries. Later accounts in the latter half of the 19th century onward noted the birds' sparseness and absence.

Genetic evidence suggests that while populations had been in decline since the last glacial maximum, the lack of evidence of inbreeding suggests that the birds declined very quickly.

The birds' range collapsed from east to west with settlement and clearing of the eastern and southern deciduous forests. John J. Audubon commented as early as 1832 on the decline of the birds. The bird was rarely reported outside Florida after 1860. The last reported sighting east of the Mississippi River (except Florida) was in 1878 in Kentucky. By the turn of the century, it was restricted to the swamps of central Florida. The last known wild specimen was killed in Okeechobee County, Florida, in 1904, and the last captive bird died at the Cincinnati Zoo on February 21, 1918. This was the male specimen, Incas, that died within a year of his mate, Lady Jane. Additional reports of the bird were made in Okeechobee County, Florida, until the late 1920s, but these are not supported by specimens. However two sets of eggs purportedly taken from active nests in 1927 are in the collection of the Florida Museum of Natural History, and genetic testing could prove the species was still breeding at that time. Not until 1939, however, did the American Ornithologists' Society declare the Carolina parakeet to be extinct. The IUCN has listed the species as extinct since 1920.

In 1937, three parakeets resembling this species were sighted and filmed in the Okefenokee Swamp of Georgia. However, the American Ornithologists' Union analyzed the film and concluded that they had probably filmed feral parakeets. A year later, in 1938, a flock of parakeets was apparently sighted by a group of experienced ornithologists in the swamps of the Santee River basin in South Carolina, but this sighting was doubted by most other ornithologists. The birds were never seen again after this sighting, and shortly after a portion of the area was destroyed to make way for power lines, making the species' continued existence unlikely.

About 720 skins and 16 skeletons are housed in museums around the world, and analyzable DNA has been extracted from them.

=== Reasons for extinction ===
Turnaround video of a mounted skeleton, Naturalis

The evidence is indicative that humans had at least a contributory role in the extinction of the Carolina parakeet, through a variety of means. Chief was deforestation in the 18th and 19th centuries. Hunting played a significant role, both for decorative use of their colorful feathers, for example, adornment of women's hats, and for reduction of crop predation. This was partially offset by the recognition of their value in controlling invasive cockleburs. Minor roles were played by capture for the pet trade and, as noted in Pacific Standard, by the introduction for crop pollination of European honeybees that competed for nest sites.

A factor that exacerbated their decline to extinction was the flocking behavior that led them to return to the vicinity of dead and dying birds (such as birds downed by hunting), enabling wholesale slaughter.

The final extinction of the species in the early years of the 20th century is somewhat of a mystery, as it happened so rapidly. Vigorous flocks with many juveniles and reproducing pairs were noted as late as 1896, and the birds were long-lived in captivity, but they had virtually disappeared by 1904. Sufficient nest sites remained intact, so deforestation was not the final cause. American ornithologist Noel F. Snyder speculates that the most likely cause seems to be that the birds succumbed to poultry disease, although no recent or historical records exist of New World parrot populations being afflicted by domestic poultry diseases. The modern poultry scourge Newcastle disease was not detected until 1926 in Indonesia, and only a subacute form of it was reported in the United States in 1938. Genetic research on samples did not show any significant presence of bird viruses (though this does not solely rule out disease).

== See also ==
- Green parakeet, the other living U.S. parrot, found in southern Texas
- Monk parakeet, a prevalent feral parrot in the United States, often incorrectly presumed to be native
- Feral parrots, other non-native parrots in the United States
