= Chandigarh Bird Park =

Zoo in Chandigarh

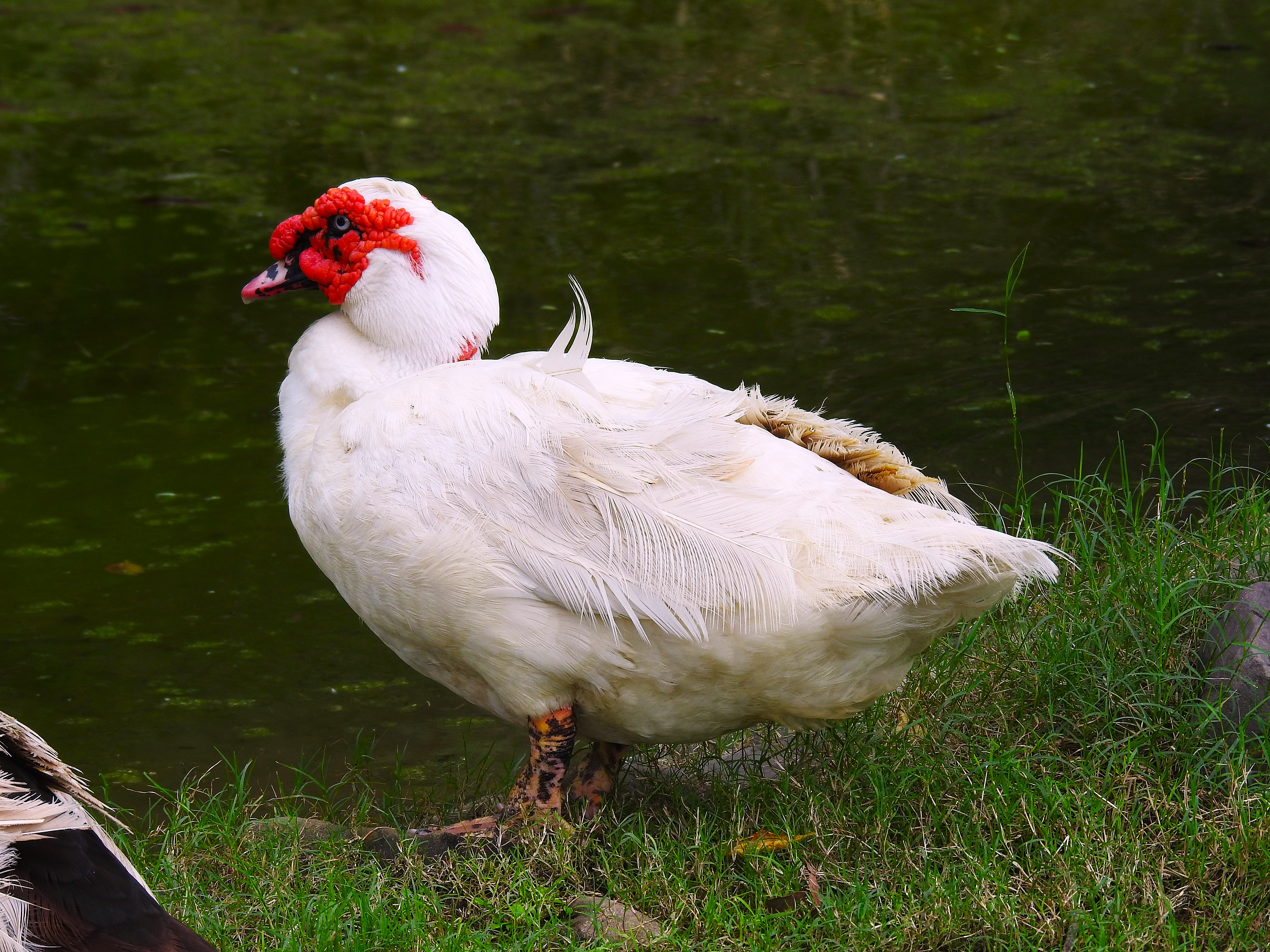
- Muscovy duck at Chandigarh Bird Park
- Interactive map of Chandigarh Bird Park
- 30°44′55″N 76°48′37″E
- Date opened: 16 November 2021; 4 years ago
- Location: Sector-1, Chandigarh
- Land area: 2.63 ha (6.5 acres)
- No. of species: 48
- Annual visitors: 329,332 (FY 2024/25)
- Website: chandigarhtourism.gov.in/bird-park

Chandigarh Bird Park is a tourist attraction in Sector-1, Chandigarh. It is located near the Sukhna Lake and is spread across 2.63 ha (6.5 acres). Developed by the Chandigarh Forest Department, it has two small aviaries and two walk-through aviaries, with a 58-foot flying height and a total ground area of approximately 200×150 feet each. The park houses 1,200 birds of 48 different species, including several exotic aquatic, terrestrial and tamed species.

The park was inaugurated in November 2021 by the then First Lady Savita Kovind and is loosely based on the Jurong Bird Park, Singapore.

== Exhibits ==
There are around 1,200 birds in all, belonging to 48 species and sub-species. The main attractions include African love birds, budgerigars, macaw, white swan, black swan, wood duck, golden pheasant, yellow golden pheasant, melanistic pheasant, sun conures, African grey parrot and finches.

== Gallery ==
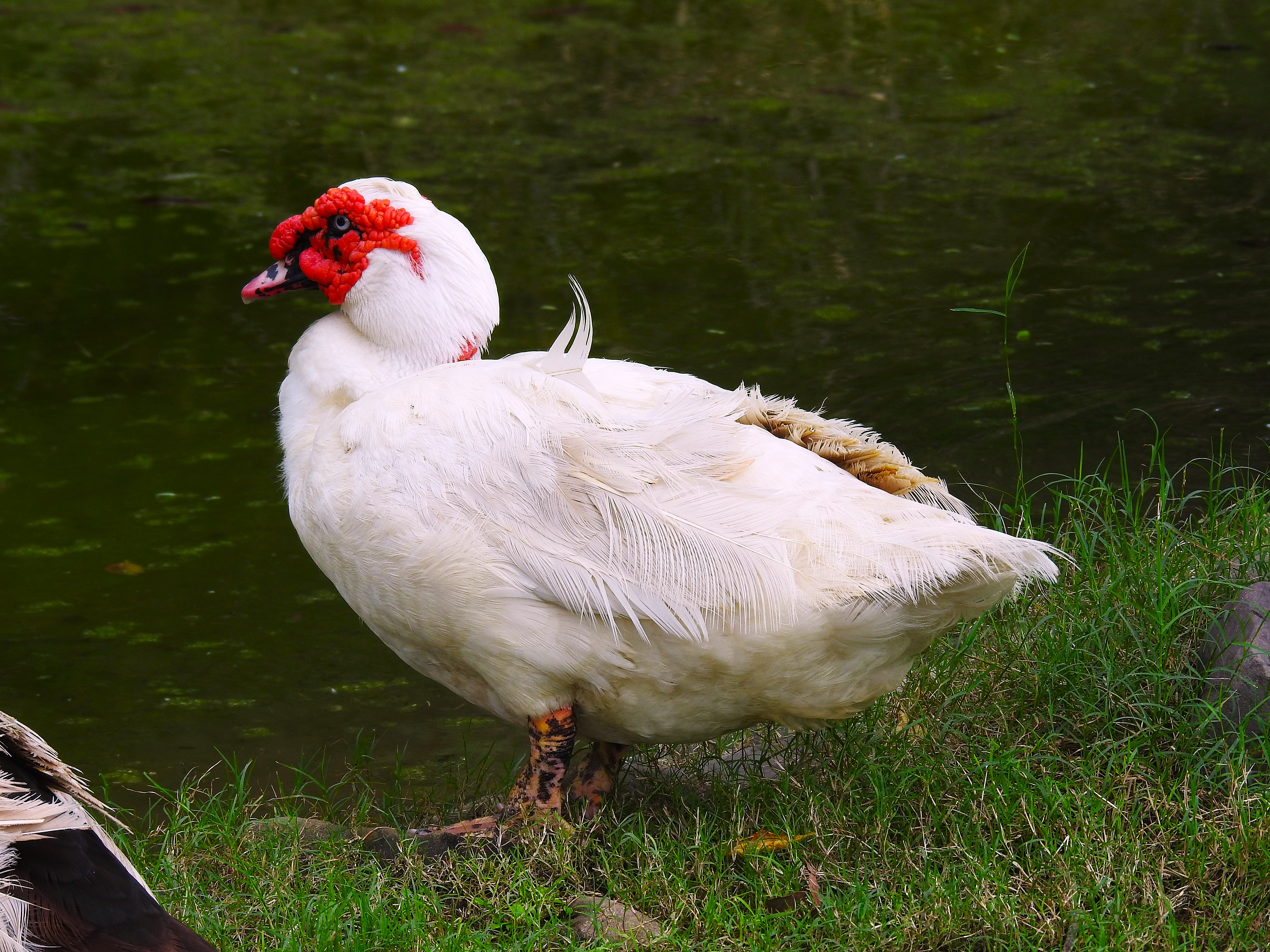
Muscovy duck

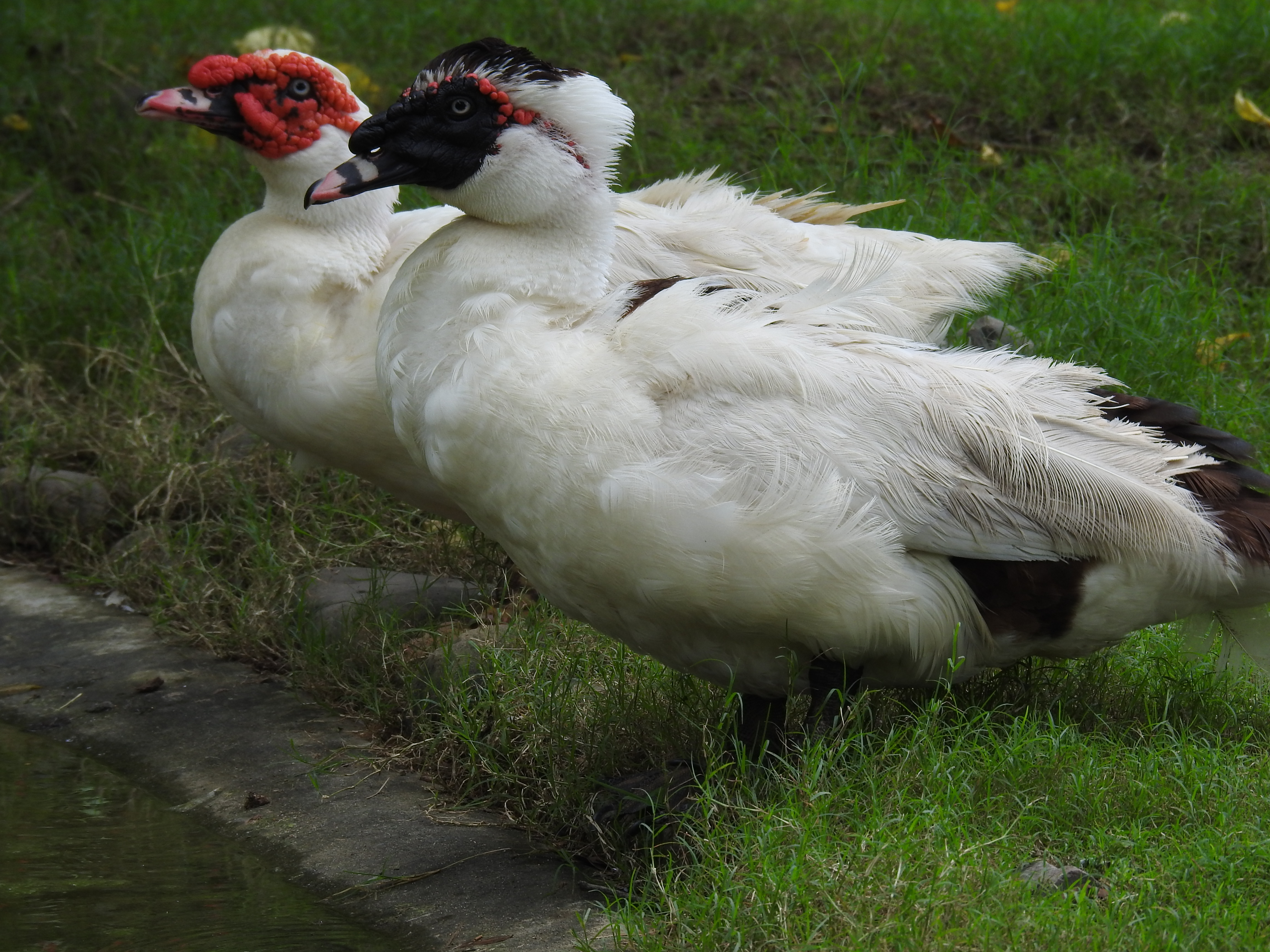
Muscovy ducks

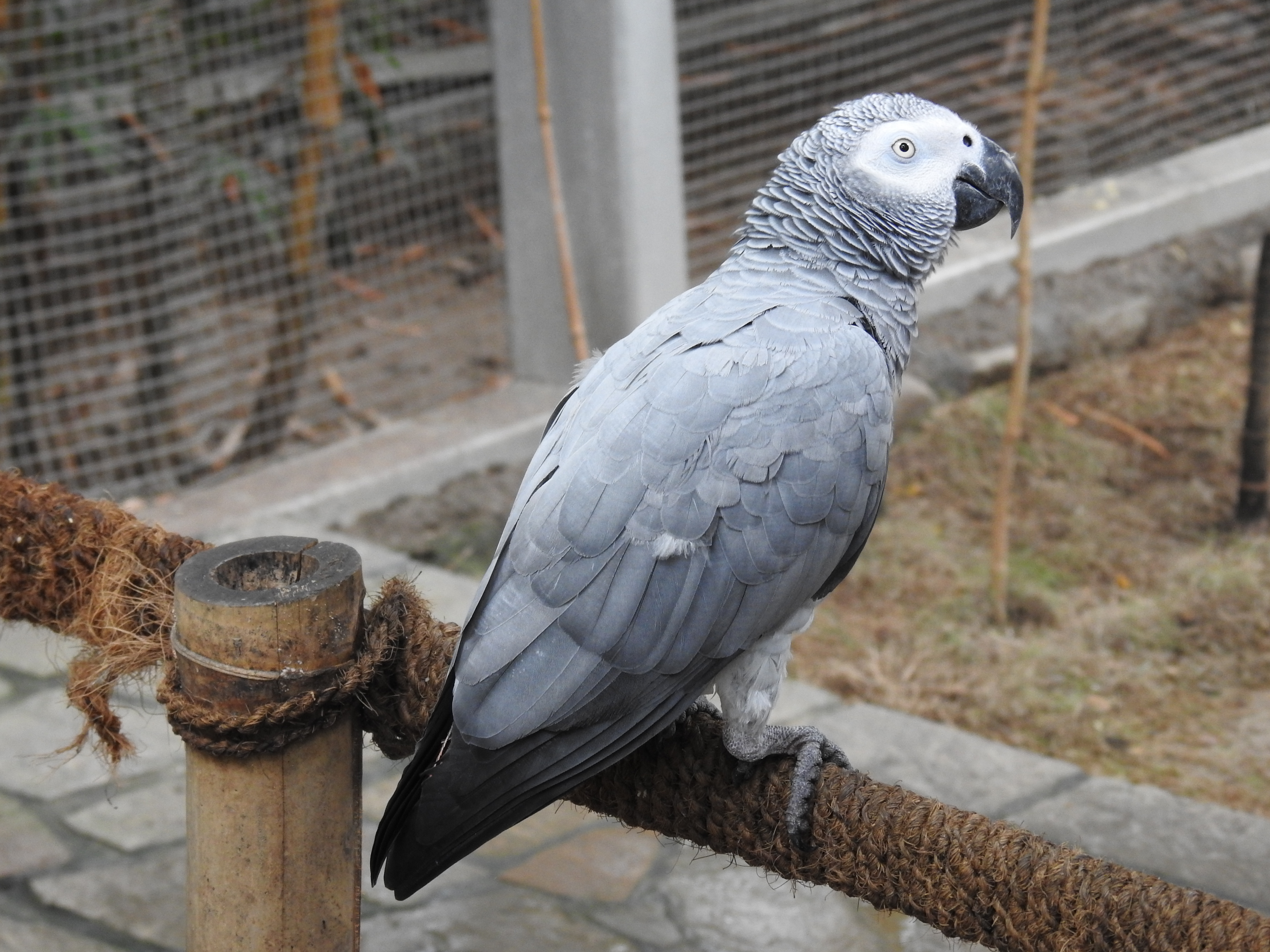
African grey parrot

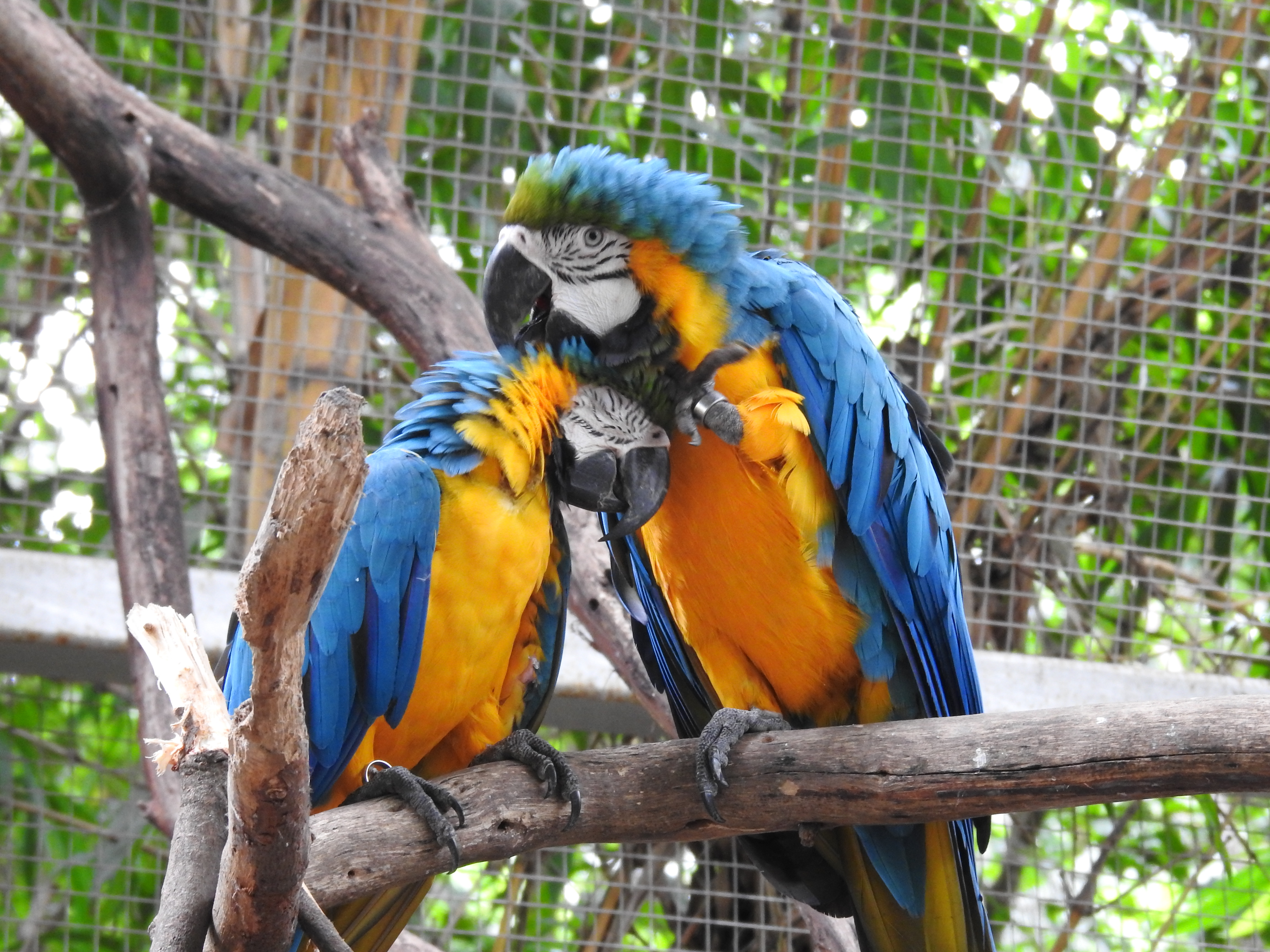
Macaws

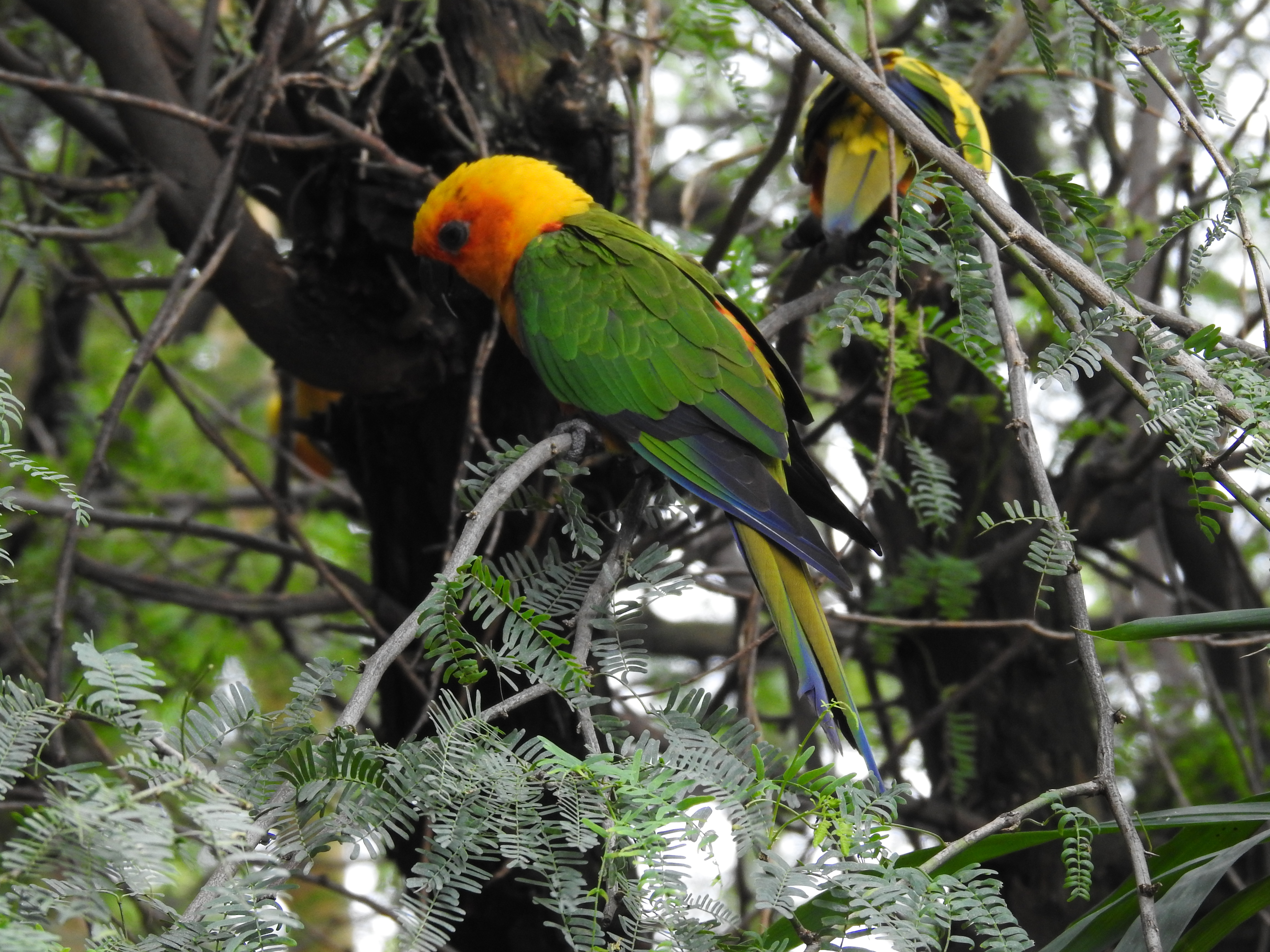
Jenday Conure

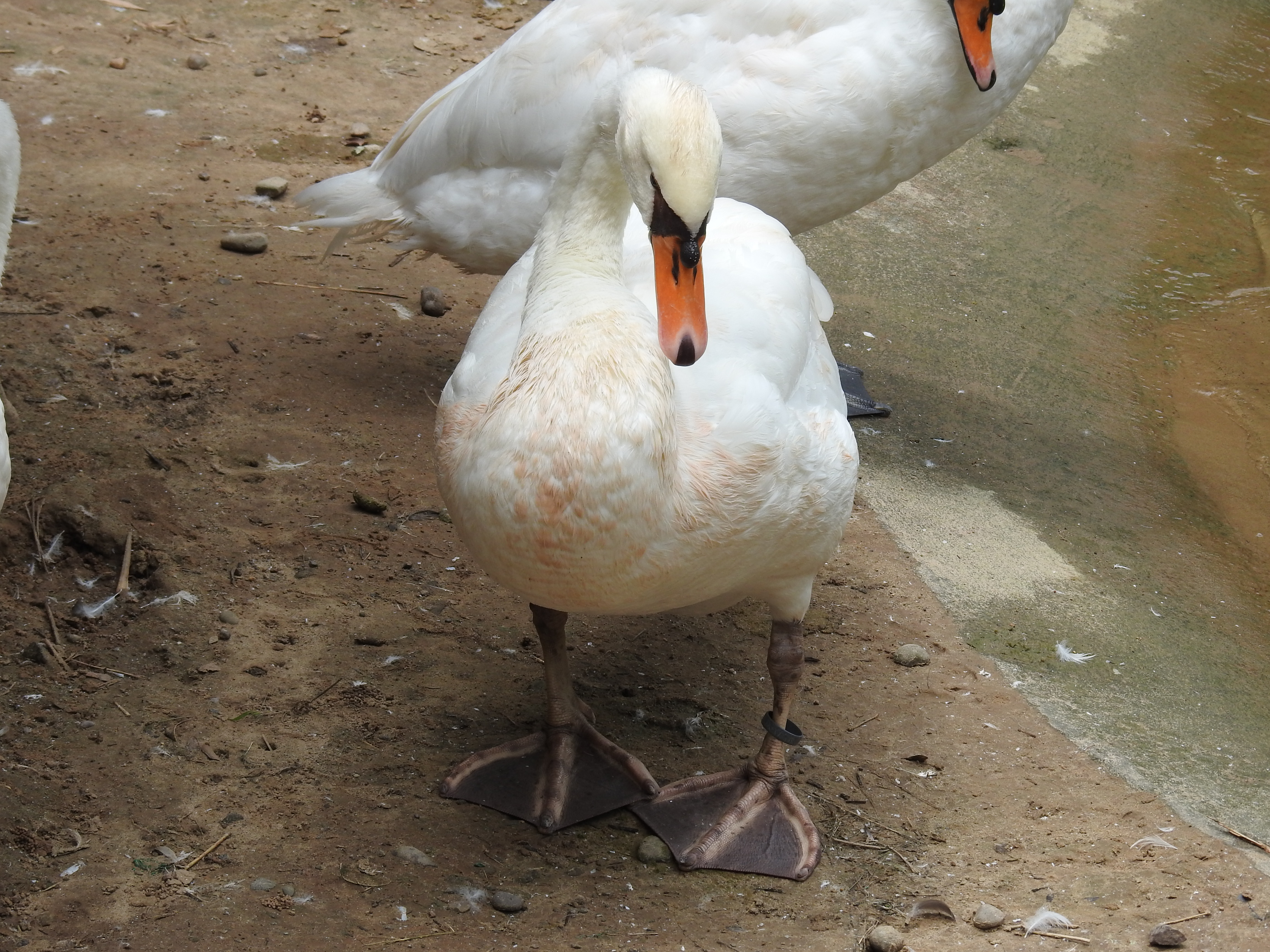
Mute swans

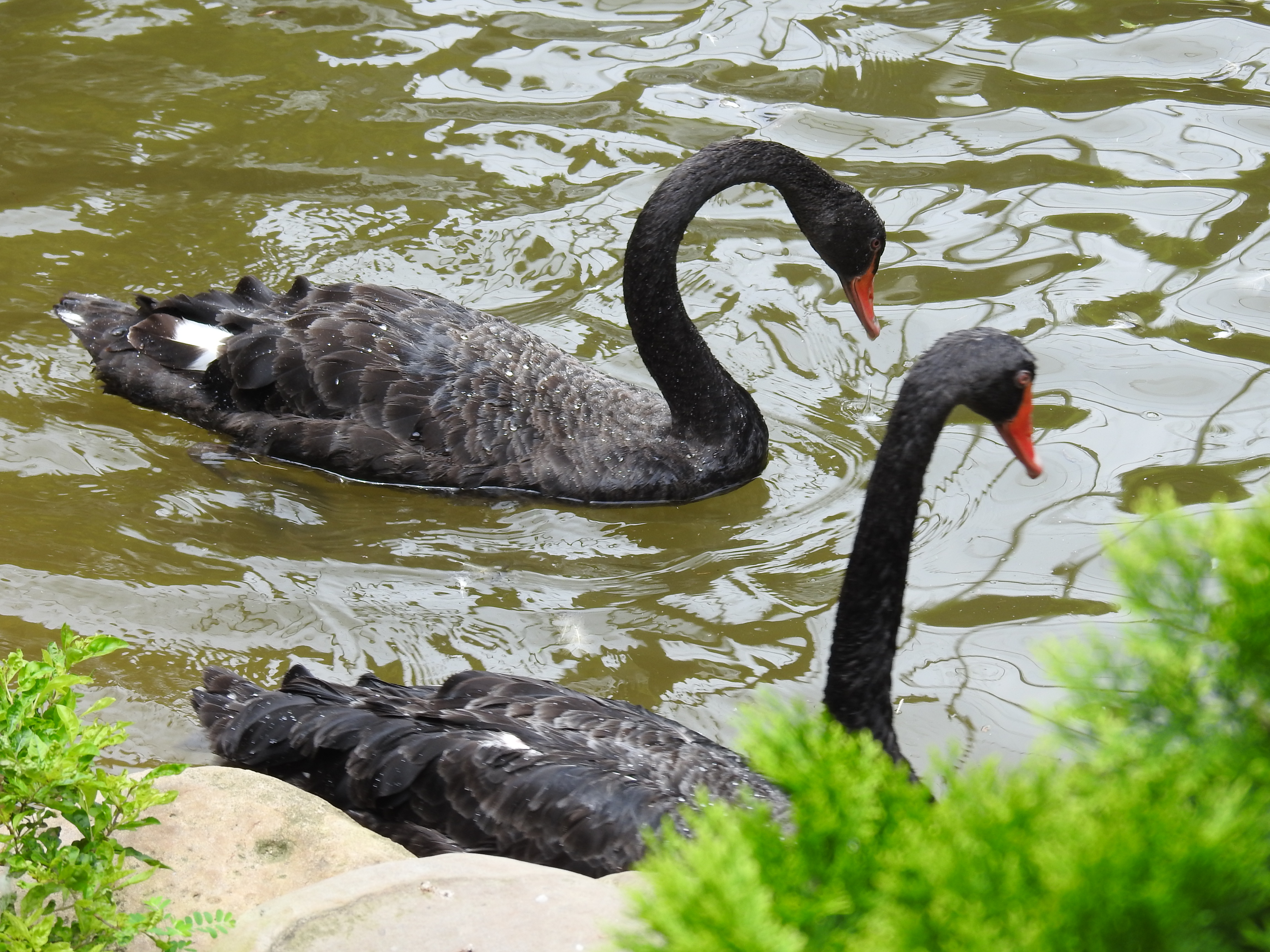
Black swans

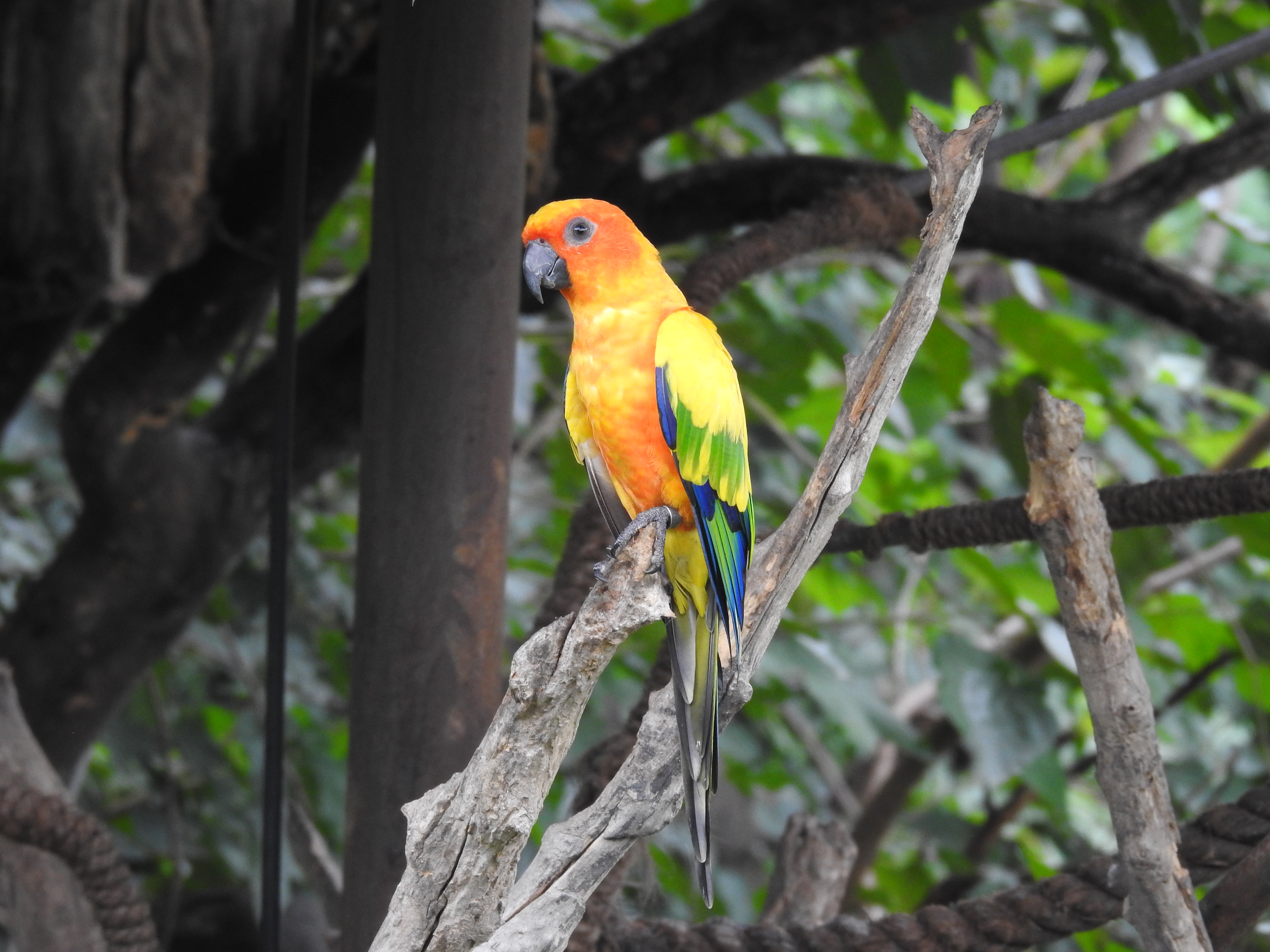
Sun conure
