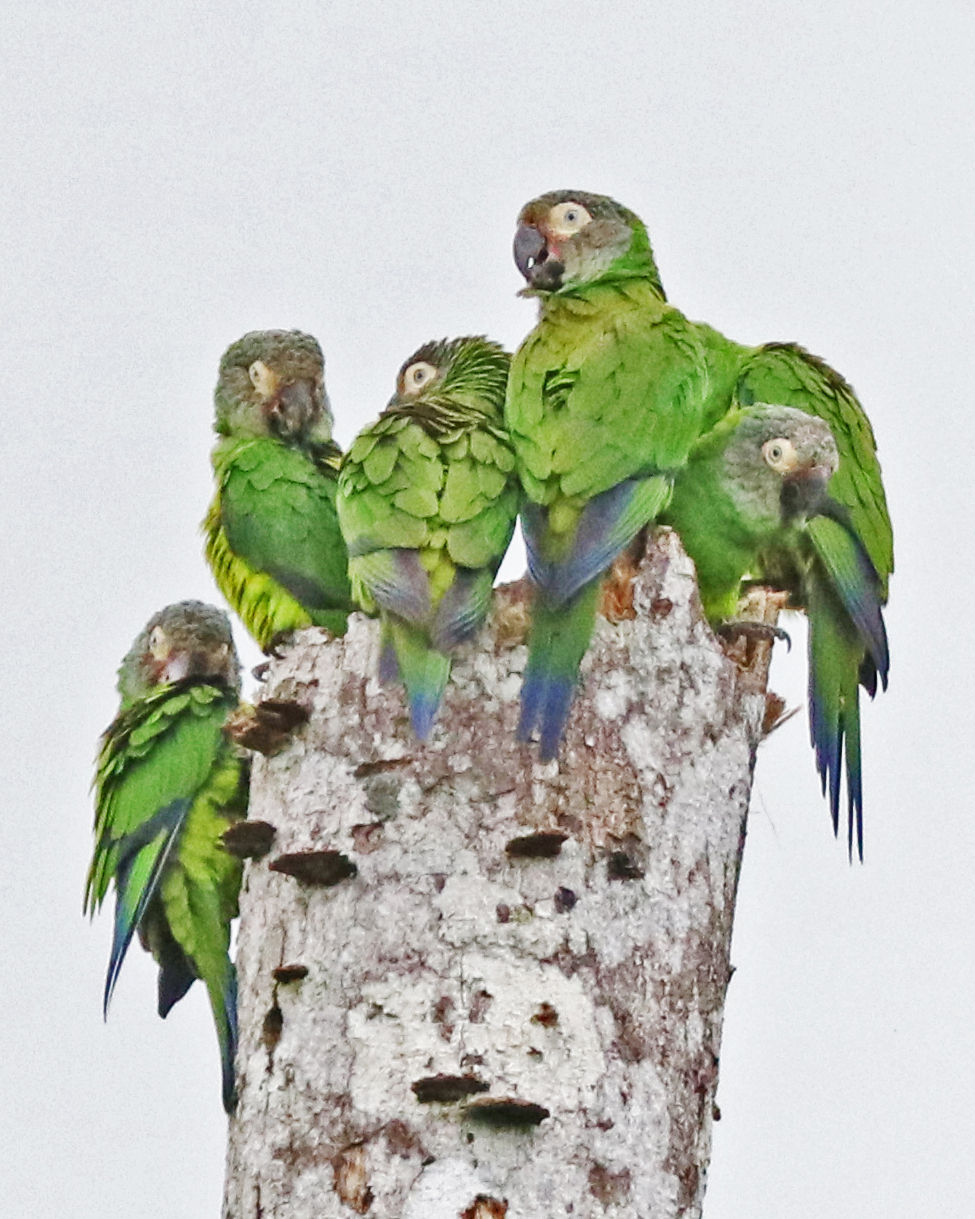
- in eastern Ecuador

Conservation status
- Least Concern (IUCN 3.1)

Scientific classification
- Kingdom: Animalia
- Phylum: Chordata
- Class: Aves
- Order: Psittaciformes
- Family: Psittacidae
- Genus: Aratinga
- Species: A. weddellii

Binomial name
- Aratinga weddellii (Deville, 1851)

Synonyms
- Conurus weddellii Deville, 1851

= Dusky-headed parakeet =

Dusky-headed conure

Species of bird

The dusky-headed parakeet (Aratinga weddellii), also known as Weddell's conure or dusky-headed conure in aviculture, is a small green Neotropical parrot with dusty grey head found in wooded habitats in the western Amazon basin of South America. Its range extends from southeastern Colombia south through eastern Ecuador, eastern Peru, and southwest Amazonian Brazil, to central Bolivia. It prefers semiopen habitats such as várzea, forest edge, and forest remnants, but can also be found in coffee plantations. It is generally common and its habitat preference makes it less vulnerable than many other Amazonian species. Consequently, it is considered to be of least concern by BirdLife International and IUCN.

This long-tailed species is generally green in color (both lutino and blue mutations are rare, but do exist in captivity) with a gray-brown head, a blue-tipped tail, and remiges that are dark gray from below, mainly blue from above. The bill is black, and it has a broad, bare, white (sometimes yellow-tinged) eye-ring. With a typical length of 25–28 cm (10–11 in) and a weight around 100 grams, it is slightly smaller than the sun conure. Many people call these conures mini-macaws because they have skin near their beaks and eyes, similar to the macaw.

It is social, and usually found in pairs or small groups. It may even flock with different species of conures. When food is plentiful, it may form flocks of up to 100 members. It eats fruit, seeds, and flowers, and searches decaying wood for insect larvae. It also ingests mineral-rich soil, e.g., from a clay lick, as a supplement. A pair raises their offspring together, nesting in woodpecker holes in trees or arboreal termite nests.

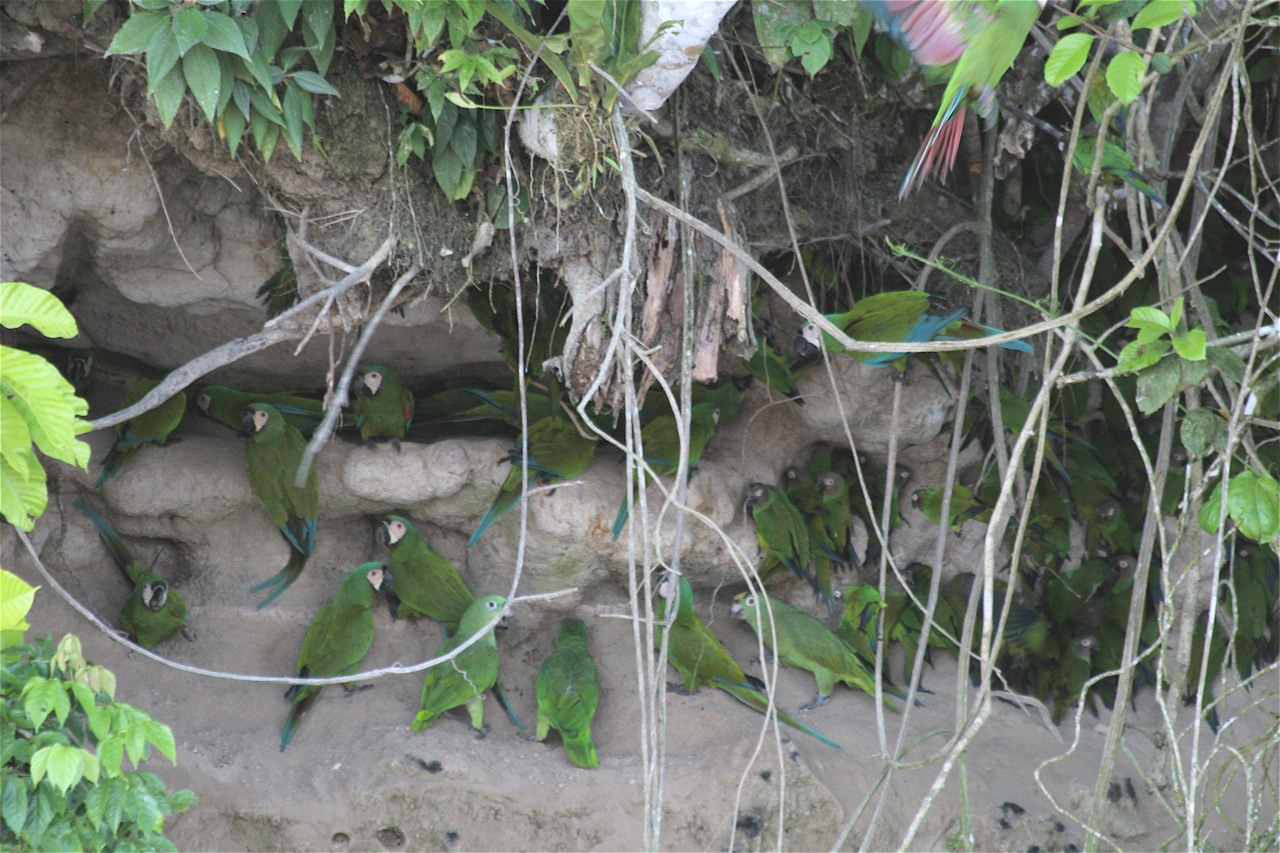
With macaws and amazons at a clay lick in Ecuador

Consuming clay is believed to provide a mineral supplement and neutralise toxins in their diet. Their predators (along with many other neotropical parrots) include many birds of prey, monkeys, and in some cases, jaguars.

They do well in captivity. They are fairly easy to breed if provided with a durable nest box, and will lay up to three clutches per year. They are known to be quiet, compared to other conure species, but still very energetic and playful, like most conures. These conures' lifespans range from 25 to 50 years, though their typical lifespans are usually 35–40 years.

Recently, they have been sighted as a colony in the coastal districts of Lima, Perú. They probably came as pets, and have settled in this city.
