= Nanday parakeet =

- At Transpantaneira, Poconé, Mato Grosso, Brazil

Conservation status
- Least Concern (IUCN 3.1)

Scientific classification
- Kingdom: Animalia
- Phylum: Chordata
- Class: Aves
- Order: Psittaciformes
- Family: Psittacidae
- Genus: Aratinga
- Species: A. nenday

Binomial name
- Aratinga nenday (Vieillot, 1823)

Synonyms
- Nandayus nenday (Vieillot 1823)

Species of bird

The nanday parakeet (Aratinga nenday), also known as the black-headed parakeet, black-hooded parakeet or nanday conure, is a medium-small, mostly green, Neotropical parrot native to south-central continental South America.

== Taxonomy ==
The nanday parakeet was previously regarded as a member of the monotypic genus Nandayus Bonaparte, 1854, one of the rough 16 genera of Neotropical parrots of tribe Arini which includes the conures and macaws. However, phylogenetic evidence showed that it is positioned in one of the four groups in the genus Aratinga. When the genus Aratinga was revised and split in four separate genera, this species was included in the current genus Aratinga. This revision was based on earlier studies. According to a mtDNA-based phylogenetic analysis of the genus Aratinga by Ribas & Miyaki (2004), the nanday parakeet forms a monophyletic group with the sun conure (A. solstitialis), jandaya parakeet (A. jandaya), and golden-capped parakeet (A. auricapilla). Tavares et al. (2005) in a mitochondrial and nuclear DNA analysis of 29 species representing 25 of 30 genera of Neotropical parrots found the nanday parakeet's closest relative to be Aratinga solstitialis, the sun conure, and the time of divergence of the species to have been 0.5 to 1.3 Mya.

Hybrids of the nanday parakeet and sun conure, nanday and jandaya parakeets, and nanday and blue-crowned parakeets are known.

A prehistoric relative, Aratinga vorohuensis, was described from Late Pliocene fossils found in Argentina.

== Description ==
The nanday parakeet is 32–37 cm (13–15 in) long, weighs 120–140 g (4.2–4.9 oz), and is mostly green. Its most distinguishing characteristic, from which its alternative names derive, is its black facial mask and beak. It also shows black, trailing flight feathers on its wings and has a long tail edged at the end in blue. The upper chest is bluish-green and the lower chest is a paler green. Feathers covering the thighs are red. The eye has a bare (featherless) eye ring.

== Distribution ==
The species is native to South America from southeast Bolivia to southwest Brazil, central Paraguay, and northern Argentina, from the region known as the Pantanal.

=== Feral distribution ===
Caged birds have been released in some areas, and the birds have established self-sustaining populations in Israel, Tenerife, Los Angeles, California, San Antonio, Texas, and several areas of Florida (including Pasco, Sarasota, Pinellas, Manatee, Broward, Palm Beach and Miami-Dade Counties) in the United States.

== Behavior ==
=== Food and feeding ===
The bird feeds on seeds, fruit, palm nuts, berries, flowers, and buds. Feral birds also come to bird feeders. Wild birds primarily use scrub forest and forest clearings around settlements. They frequent open savannah, pastures, and stockyards in South America, where they are considered as pests in some areas.

=== Breeding ===
Nanday parakeets usually find holes in trees to nest. Females lay three or four eggs. After raising their young, all birds form rather large communal roosts until the next breeding season.

== Aviculture ==
The Nanday parakeet is sometimes kept as a companion parrot. It is a loud, energetic bird that requires much mental and social stimulation, and significant time outside of its cage in order to thrive. It may not be a suitable pet for small children due to its powerful beak. When kept in captivity, it may learn to talk and is also capable of learning tricks. The World Parrot Trust recommends that the Nanday parakeet be kept in an aviary of 2–3 metres in length. The longest verified lifespan for this species is 18.7 years - however, there are also reports of Nanday parakeets living for 30 years in captivity.

Pair of Nanday parakeets in the wild in Brazil

Nanday parakeets at their nest in Brazil

Nanday parakeets in the Mato Grosso

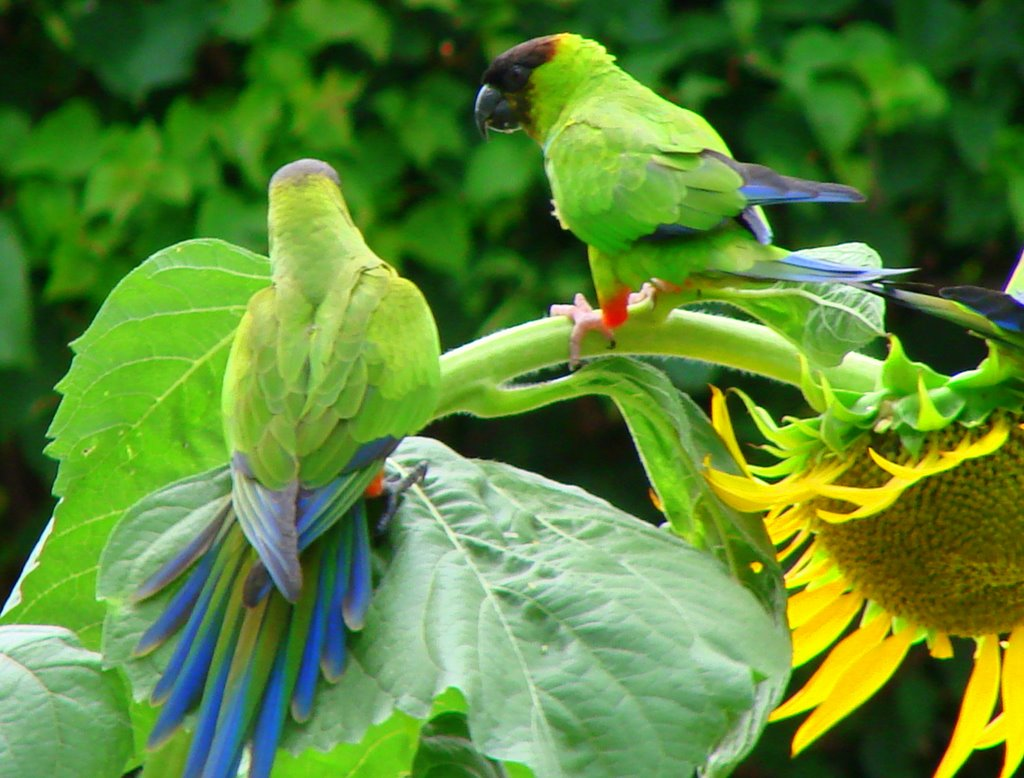
Nanday parakeets living feral in Sarasota County, Florida

== Bibliography ==
- "National Geographic" Field Guide to the Birds of North America ISBN 0-7922-6877-6
- Handbook of the Birds of the World Vol 4, Josep del Hoyo editor, ISBN 84-87334-22-9
- "National Audubon Society" The Sibley Guide to Birds, by David Allen Sibley, ISBN 0-679-45122-6
