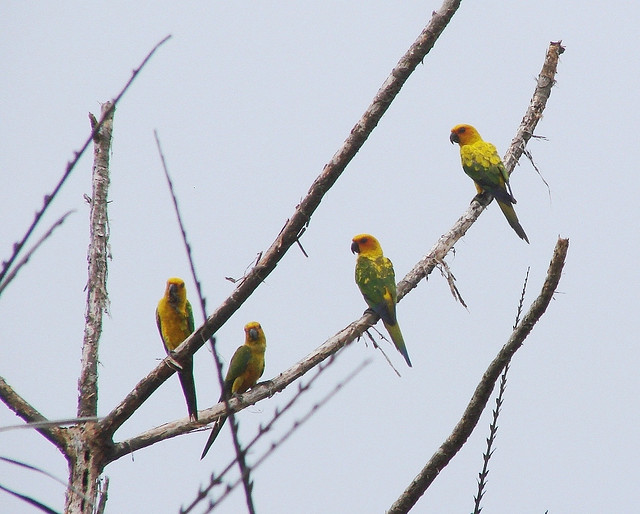

Conservation status
- Least Concern (IUCN 3.1)
- CITES Appendix II (CITES)

Scientific classification
- Kingdom: Animalia
- Phylum: Chordata
- Class: Aves
- Order: Psittaciformes
- Family: Psittacidae
- Genus: Aratinga
- Species: A. maculata

Binomial name
- Aratinga maculata (Statius Müller, 1776)

Synonyms
- Aratinga pintoi Silveira, de Lima & Höfling, 2005; Psittacus luteus Boddaert, 1783

= Sulphur-breasted parakeet =

Species of bird

The sulphur-breasted parakeet (Aratinga maculata), or sulphur-breasted conure is a species of bird in subfamily Arinae of the family Psittacidae, the African and New World parrots. It is found in Brazil and Suriname. It resembles the closely related sun parakeet (A. solstitialis).

== Taxonomy and systematics ==
The sulphur-breasted parakeet was originally described as Psittacus maculatus. For many years the early specimens were thought to be immature sun parakeets or hybrids, and the current specific epithet maculata was thought to be invalid. A 2005 paper described what was thought to be a new species A. pintoi but in 2009 the "new" species was determined to be the previously described A. maculata. The reclassification was widely accepted but not without some dissent.

The sulphur-breasted parakeet is monotypic.

== Description ==
The sulphur-breasted parakeet is about 30 cm (12 in) long and weighs about 110 g (3.9 oz). The sexes are alike. The adults' crown and mantle are pale greenish yellow. Their wing coverts range from yellow through green to deep blue; the flight feathers are also deep blue on their upper side. Their tail's upper side is mostly green, with blue tips on the inner feathers and progressively more blue outwards to the entirely blue outermost pair. Their head below the crown and their underparts are mostly yellow, with orange through the eye and on small areas of the belly and flanks. The undersides of their flight feathers and tail are blackish gray. Their iris is dark gray surrounded by bare bluish gray skin, their bill black, and their legs and feet dark brownish. Juveniles have a green head, mantle, and wing coverts. The species closely resembles the sun parakeet but has less orange and more green.

== Distribution and habitat ==
The sulphur-breasted parakeet has two disjunct ranges. It is found in Brazil's Pará state north of the lower Amazon River between the Maicuru and Paru rivers, and also in Suriname's Sipaliwini Savanna. It probably also occurs in the Brazilian state of Amapá but has not been confirmed there.

The sulphur-breasted parakeet inhabits open to semi-open landscapes, typically those with sandy soils and scattered trees and bushes. It also occurs in gallery forest, and occasionally in orchards. In elevation it ranges as high as 1,400 m (4,600 ft).

== Behavior ==
=== Movement ===
The sulphur-breasted parakeet is generally a year-round resident but does make some local movements.

=== Feeding ===
The sulphur-breasted parakeet typically forages singly and also in groups of up to about 10 individuals. It feeds on fruit, seeds, and flowers.

=== Breeding ===
The sulphur-breasted parakeet nests in tree cavities. Active nests have been found in April and September; both were in dead Hymenaea trees and one of them contained a single egg. Nothing else is known about the species' breeding biology in the wild.

=== Vocalization ===
The sulphur-breasted parakeet's call has been described as a "high-pitched shrill screech of 2–3 notes, 'screek screek screek' ", and also as a "sharp, very high shrieking, like 'eeuwt-uht-uht' ".

== Status ==
The IUCN has assessed the sulphur-breasted parakeet as being of Least Concern. Though it has a somewhat limited range and its population size is not known, the latter is believed to be increasing. Deforestation is a potential threat but might instead be beneficial to the species if it is not excessive or too rapid, as it may expand its range into opened areas. It does not appear to be greatly affected by capture for the pet trade. It is thought to be fairly common in both of its ranges.

== Aviculture ==
The sulphur-breasted parakeet is almost never seen in captivity outside of Brazil, where it is sometimes kept as a pet or exhibited in zoos. Captive sulphur-breasted parakeets lay a clutch of 3-4 eggs, which are incubated for 24–25 days, with the young fledging after 7–8 weeks.
