= Aratinga vorohuensis =

Aratinga vorohuensis Temporal range: Late Pliocene (Uquian) ~3–2.6 Ma

Scientific classification
- Domain: Eukaryota
- Kingdom: Animalia
- Phylum: Chordata
- Class: Aves
- Order: Psittaciformes
- Family: Psittacidae
- Genus: Aratinga
- Species: A. vorohuensis

Binomial name
- Aratinga vorohuensis (Tonni & Noriega 1996)

Synonyms
- Nandayus vorohuensis

Extinct species of bird

Aratinga vorohuensis is a prehistoric relative of the nanday parakeet described from Late Pliocene fossils found in, and named after, the Vorohué Formation of Buenos Aires Province, Argentina.
