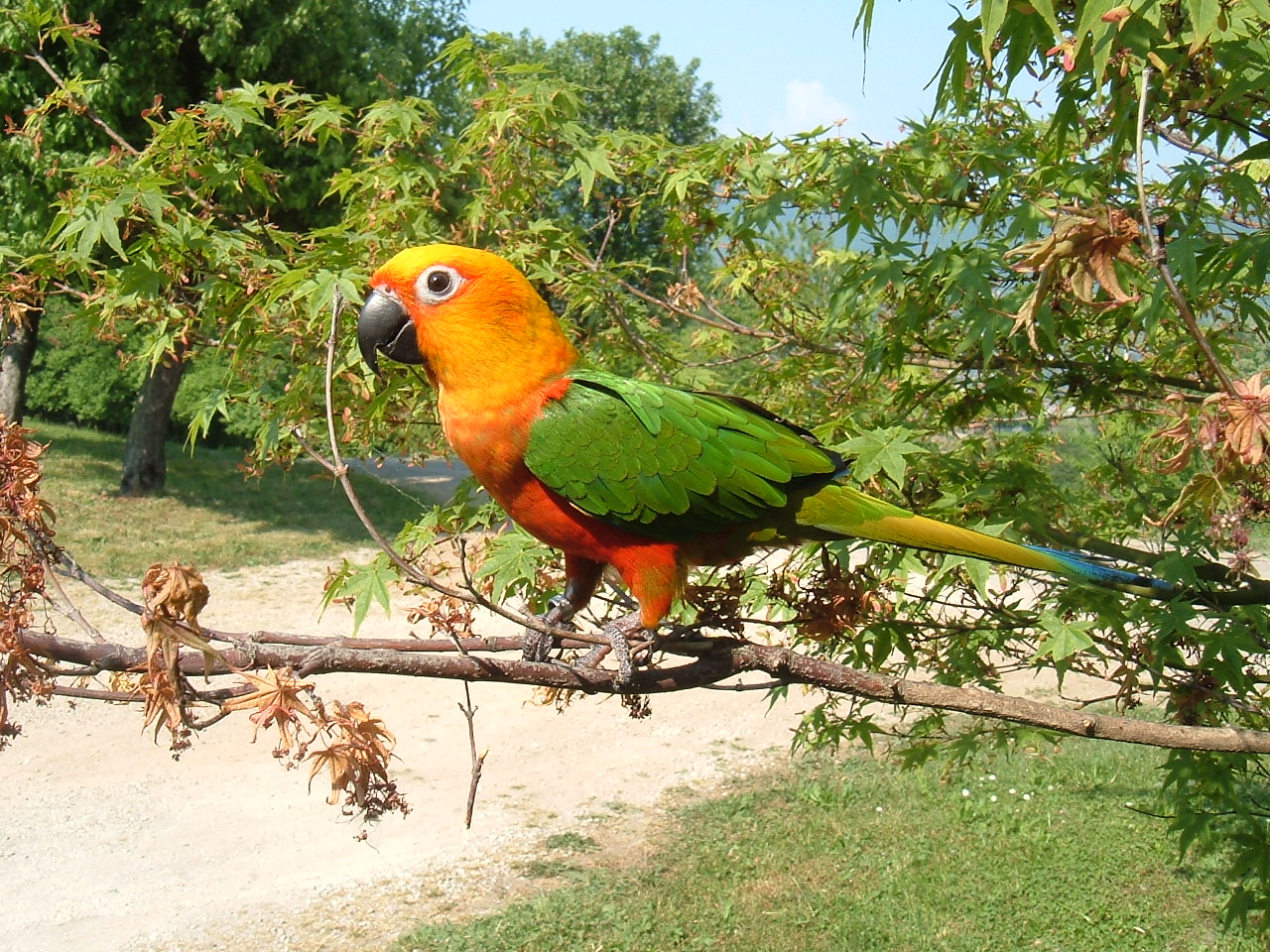

Conservation status
- Least Concern (IUCN 3.1)

Scientific classification
- Kingdom: Animalia
- Phylum: Chordata
- Class: Aves
- Order: Psittaciformes
- Family: Psittacidae
- Genus: Aratinga
- Species: A. jandaya

Binomial name
- Aratinga jandaya (Gmelin, JF, 1788)

Synonyms
- Psittacus jandaya Conurus jandaya

= Jandaya parakeet =

Species of bird in Brazil

The jandaya parakeet (Aratinga jandaya), or jenday conure, is a small Neotropical parrot with green wings and tail, reddish-orange body, yellow head and neck, orange cheeks, and black bill, native to wooded habitats in northeastern Brazil. It is a member of the Aratinga solstitialis complex of parakeets very closely related to, and possibly subspecies of the sun conure.

The bird has a wide range, but is locally rare in the wild; they are common in aviculture, where they are known as "jenday conures".

== Taxonomy ==
The first description of a bird called "jendaya" was by the German naturalist, Georg Marcgrave, who saw the bird during his 1638 expedition through Dutch Brazil. Based on Marcgrave's description, the jandaya parakeet was included in the works of Francis Willughby in 1678, John Ray in 1713, Mathurin Jacques Brisson in 1760, the Comte de Buffon in 1779, and John Latham in 1781. None of these ornithologists had seen a specimen of the bird. When in 1788 the German naturalist Johann Friedrich Gmelin revised and expanded Carl Linnaeus's Systema Naturae, he included the jandaya parakeet with a short description, coined the binomial name Psittacus jandaya and cited earlier publications. The jandaya parakeet is now placed in the genus Aratinga that was introduced in 1824 by the German naturalist Johann Baptist von Spix. The genus name is from the extinct Tupi language of Brasil: Ará tinga means "bright bird" or "bright parrot". The specific epithet jandaya is also from Tupi. Jandáia means "noisy crier" and was used for a type of parakeet. The species is monotypic: no subspecies are recognised.

In 1916, American ornithologist Robert Ridgway reclassified the 21–22 species of neotropical parakeets in genus Conurus into four genera, placing jandaya into the genus Aratinga. Jandaya is a member of the Aratinga solstitialis complex of parakeets very closely related to, and possibly subspecies of, the sun parakeet in genus Aratinga of smaller parakeets, one of numerous genera of New World, long-tailed parrots in tribe Arini, which also includes the Central and South American macaws. Tribe Arini together with the Amazonian parrots and a few miscellaneous genera make up subfamily Arinae of Neotropical parrots in family Psittacidae of true parrots.

Ornithologist Thomas Arndt lists this bird as a subspecies of golden-capped parakeet.

The taxonomy of this and related species and genera have been problematic; more information may be found under Sun conure#Taxonomy.

Based on size, morphology, and plumage, this species is believed to be a close living relative of the extinct Carolina parakeet, possibly the closest, though that has not been confirmed by molecular phylogenetics which found the nanday parakeet to be the Carolina parakeet's closest living relative among the species tested. The plumage of this bird is very close to that of the Carolina's and can be distinguished from the Carolina parakeet by having a yellow neck and shoulders, and a black beak instead of a buff-colored beak as the Carolina parakeet had.

An earlier molecular study found the jandaya's closest relative to be the golden parakeet.

== Description ==
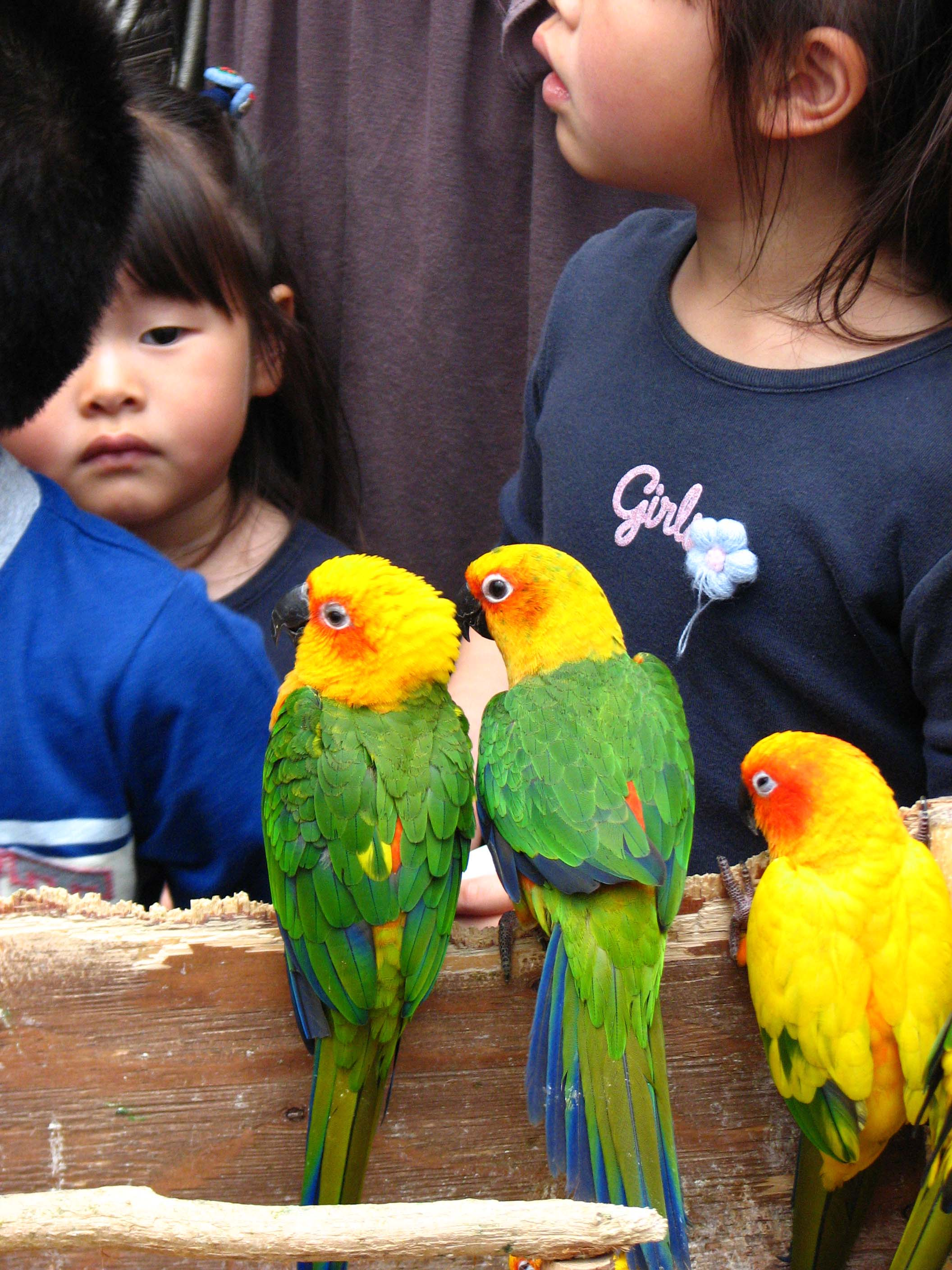
Two jenday conures (center) and one sun conure (right) at Kobe Kachoen, Japan

The jandaya parakeet is a small, long-tailed parakeet with the reddish-orange body, green wings, vent and tail, yellow head, neck, and shoulders, orange cheeks, black bill, whitish orbital ring, and dark eyes. The ends of the tail feathers are tinged in blue. It measures 30 cm (12 in) in length and weighs 125–140 gm.

The jandaya parakeet has a very loud, shrill call.

== Distribution and habitat ==
It has an extremely large range in northeastern Brazil in the states of Piauí, Maranhão, Tocantins, and Ceará, and portions of Goiás and Pará. It is found in lowland deciduous woodland and palm groves.

== Behavior and ecology ==
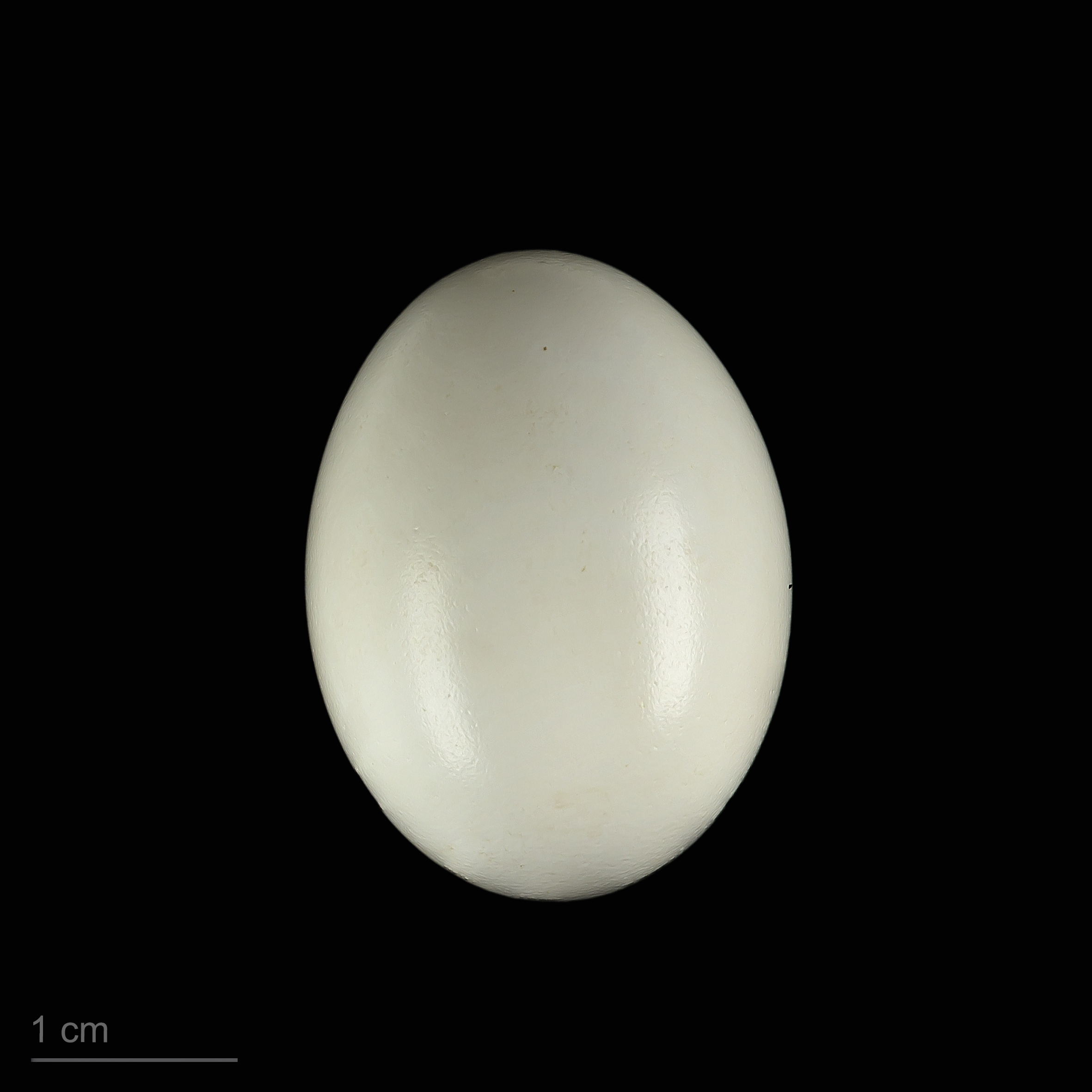
Aratinga jandaya – MHNT

=== Food and feeding ===
In the wild, it has a predilection for various fruits including mango and cashew apples, as well as palm nuts, and an unfortunate attraction to plants cultivated by humans (rice, maize, members of the family Annonaceae, etc.). Things that are toxic to jandaya parakeets include chocolate, caffeine, and a chemical often found in avocados.

=== Breeding ===
Jandaya parakeets nest in tree hollows, typically choosing a location at least 15 m (50 feet) from the ground. In captivity, the hen lays three to six eggs, which she then incubates for roughly 26 days. The young are fed by both parents, and fledge after two months.

== Conservation and threats ==
The species is listed as least concern by IUCN. It is listed on CITES Appendix II. It is protected under Brazil Wildlife Protection Act (1967), export and trade forbidden. The global population has not been quantified, but the bird was described as "rare" in two field surveys in 1996 and 2007, in parts of its former range.

== Aviculture ==
This bird is sometimes called, rather colloquially, yellow-headed conure or flaming conure.

The jandaya parakeet can live 30 years in captivity. Like many of the parakeet species commonly kept as companion parrots, jandaya parakeets are known for their intelligence, and can be trained to perform pet-like behaviors. These small parrots can often learn to mimic sounds including words and even phrases.

Jandaya parakeets are social and generally stay in flocks. They are very loud and call to each other frequently.
