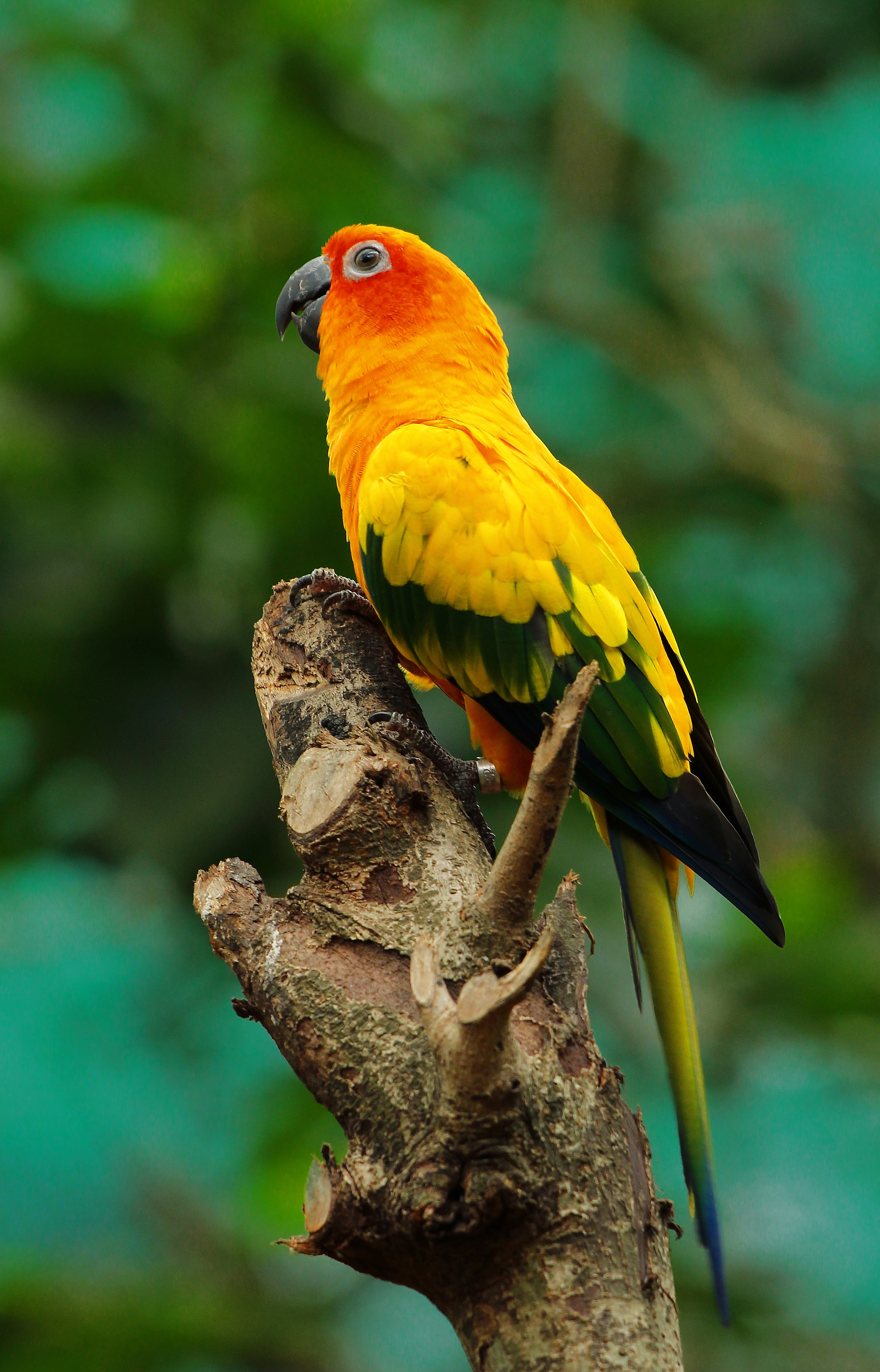
- Sun conure (Aratinga solstitialis)

Scientific classification
- Kingdom: Animalia
- Phylum: Chordata
- Class: Aves
- Order: Psittaciformes
- Family: Psittacidae
- Tribe: Arini
- Genus: Aratinga; Spix, 1824

Type species
- Psittacus luteus = Psittacus solstitialis Boddaert, 1783

Species
- Aratinga solstitialis Aratinga maculata Aratinga jandaya Aratinga auricapilla Aratinga nenday Aratinga weddellii

= Aratinga =

Genus of birds

Aratinga is a genus of South American conures. Most are predominantly green, although a few are predominantly yellow or orange. They are social and commonly seen in groups in the wild. In Brazil, the popular name of several species usually is jandaia, sometimes written as jandaya in the scientific form.

Many species from this genus are popular pets, although being larger than the members of the genus Pyrrhura, they need a sizable aviary to thrive.

== Taxonomy ==
The genus Aratinga was introduced in 1824 by the German naturalist Johann Baptist von Spix. The type species was subsequently designated as the sun parakeet. The genus name is from the extinct Tupi language of Brasil. Ará tinga means "bright bird" or "bright parrot".

The taxonomy of this genus has recently been resolved by splitting it in four genera, as the genus as previously defined was paraphyletic. The species of the Aratinga solstitialis complex were retained in this genus, while other former Aratinga species were moved to Eupsittula (brownish-throated species), Psittacara (pale-beaked species) and Thectocercus (blue-crowned parakeet). Furthermore, the closely related nanday parakeet (A. nenday) and the dusky-headed parakeet (A. weddellii) are placed in this genus. The nanday parakeet was previously placed in its own genus based on the differences in coloration and elongated upper mandible, but this was not supported by phylogenetic studies that showed a close relationship with the A. solstitialis species complex.

== Species ==
Aratinga
Common and binomial names	Image	Description	Native Range
Sun parakeet or sun conure (Aratinga solstitialis)		30 cm (12 in) long. Mostly yellow, fading to orange over the head and belly. Yellow, green in the wing featuring cobalt-blue to blue-violet flight feathers and tail feathers. Black beak.	South America
Sulphur-breasted parakeet (Aratinga maculata)			Brazil and Suriname
Jandaya parakeet or jenday conure (Aratinga jandaya)		Orange and yellow with green wings and back. Black beak.	Brazil
Golden-capped parakeet (Aratinga auricapillus)		30 cm (12 in) long. Mostly green. Black beak. Orange-red belly, red face fading to yellow over the crown.	Brazil
Dusky-headed parakeet Weddell's conure or dusky-headed conure (Aratinga weddellii)		25–28 cm (10–11 in). Mostly green. Black beak. A grey-brown head, a blue-tipped tail and remiges.	Bolivia, Brazil, Colombia, Ecuador, and Peru
Nanday parakeet (Aratinga nenday)		Mostly green. Black facial mask and beak. Black trailing flight feathers on wings and long tail edged at the end in blue. Upper chest is bluish-green and lower chest is a paler green. Feathers covering the thighs red.	SE Bolivia to SW Brazil, C Paraguay and N Argentina
Aratinga vorohuensis			Extinct. Described from Late Pliocene fossils found in Argentina.

== Hypothetical extinct species ==
Jean-Baptiste Labat described a population of small parrots living on Guadeloupe, which has been postulated to be a separate species based on little evidence. They were called Conurus labati, and are now referred to as the Guadeloupe parakeet (Aratinga labati). No specimens or remains of the extinct parrots are known. Their taxonomy may never be fully elucidated, so their postulated status as a separate species is hypothetical, and it is regarded as a hypothetical extinct species.
