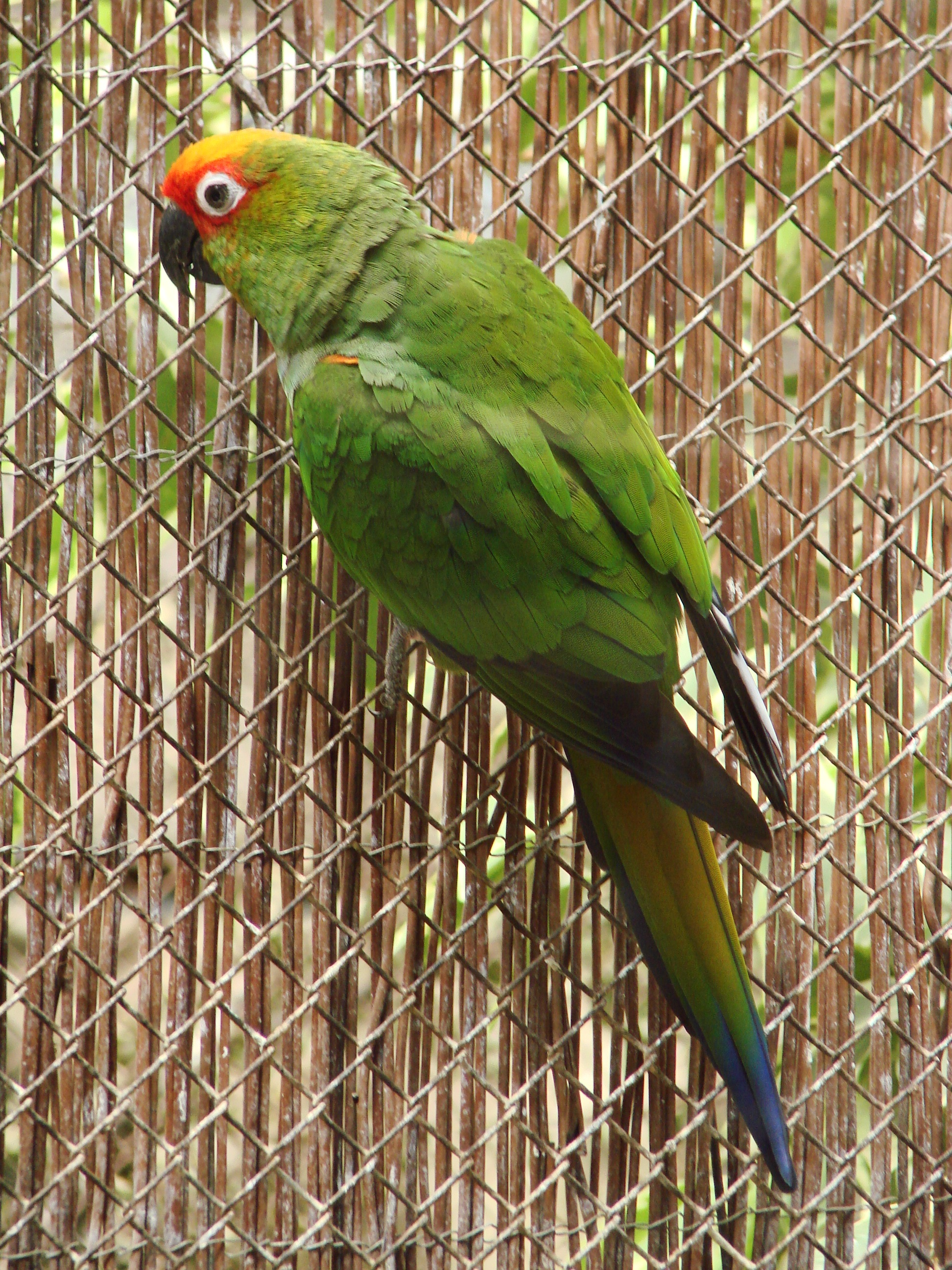
- At Wroclaw Zoo, Poland

Conservation status
- Least Concern (IUCN 3.1)

Scientific classification
- Kingdom: Animalia
- Phylum: Chordata
- Class: Aves
- Order: Psittaciformes
- Family: Psittacidae
- Genus: Aratinga
- Species: A. auricapillus

Binomial name
- Aratinga auricapillus (Kuhl, 1820)

Synonyms
- Aratinga auricapilla (Kuhl, 1820)

= Golden-capped parakeet =

Species of bird

The golden-capped parakeet (Aratinga auricapillus) is a species of parrot in the family Psittacidae endemic to Brazil. Its natural habitats are subtropical or tropical dry forest, subtropical or tropical moist lowland forest, dry savanna, and plantations. It is threatened by habitat loss. The A. auricapillus is a good biological indicator because of its vulnerability, high detectability as well as its sensitivity to forest fragmentation.

== Description ==
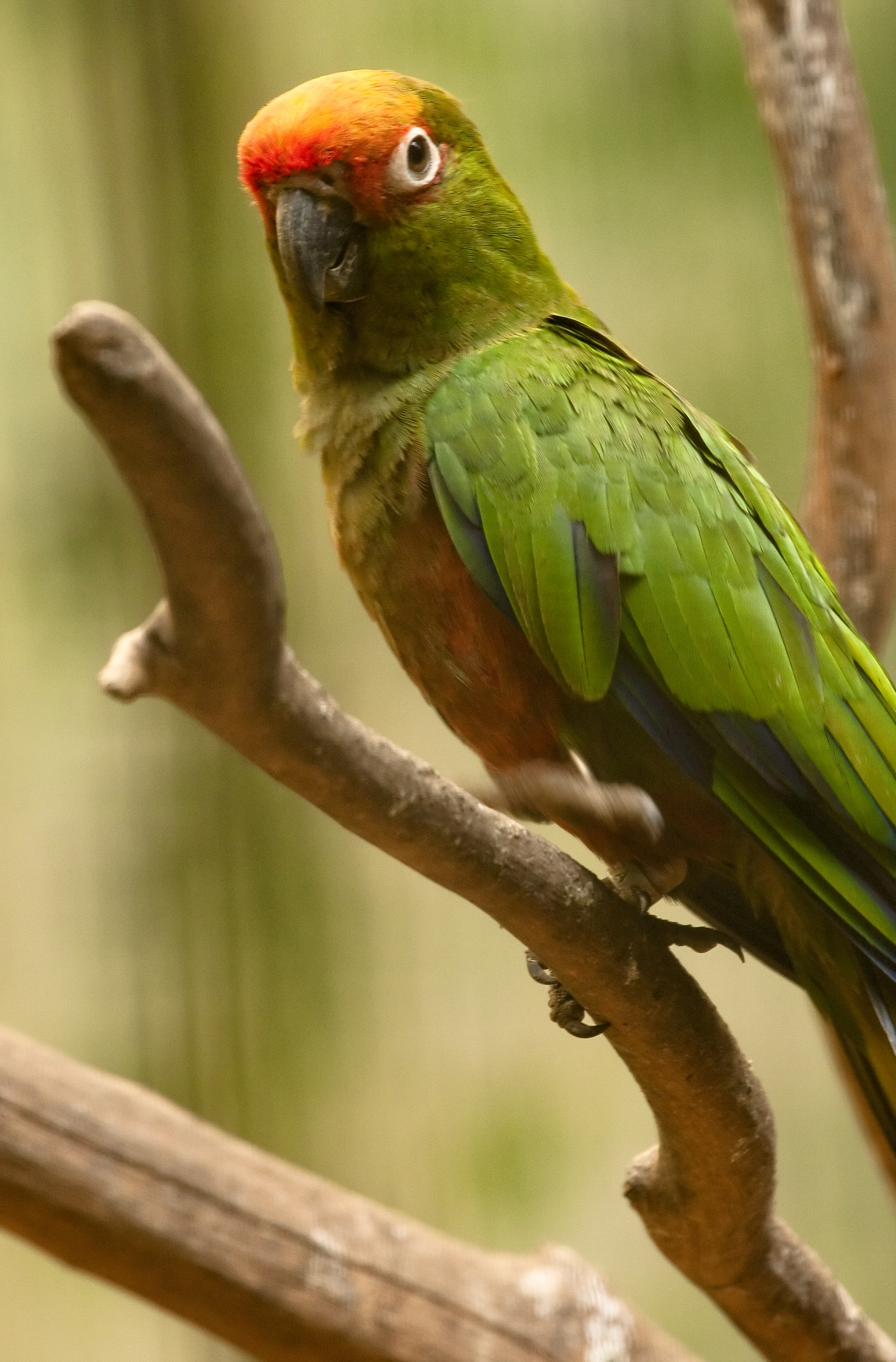
At Jurong Bird Park

It is 30 cm (12 in) long and mostly green with a black beak, white eyerings, orange-red belly, and red face fading to yellow over the crown. Juvenile members of the A. auricapillus group develop their yellow head markings and red coloration on the lower body in adulthood. The approximate weight for golden-capped parakeets is 4.9-5.25 oz.

== Taxonomy ==
The Aratinga genus name was created to describe medium to small south American conures and parrots. As such, alongside its common name as the golden-capped parakeet, it is also called the golden-capped conure. Within the A. solstitialis species group, the golden-capped parakeet is the only member considered to be polytypic: A. auricapillus is said to contain the subspecies A. a. aurifrons. The measured variable for this basis is slightly varied coloration between the two (less red on back and yellow on head for A. a. aurifrons than that of A. auricapillus). Other variables such as size were found to have little variability between the two, and thus the distinction is still under question.

== Behavior ==
As members of the Aratinga solstitialis subspecies, golden-capped parakeets tend to populate their areas of residence within forests in groups, which can range from 4 to 15 individual parakeets. The breeding season occurs during the austral summer, which in the southern hemisphere is from December to March, with pairs being sighted around November and dependent young around March. Golden-capped parakeets have a clutch size of around 3 to 5 eggs per nesting; the incubation period for these eggs is estimated to be around 25 days, and young fledglings take around 7–8 weeks before they are able to take flight.

== Habitat ==
The Aratinga auricapillus inhabits mostly the semi-deciduous forests in northeastern Brazil, although through time it has adapted to rural agricultural areas and sometimes even urban cities, spreading throughout the states of Bahia, Minas Gerais, Espírito Santo, Rio de Janeiro, São Paulo, Goiás, and Paraná.

== Diet ==
A. auricapillus's dietary behavior is classified as frugivorous. However, the parakeets have been reported to have other food sources, including seeds, flower petals and buds, nectar, and lichens. During a 2010 to 2012 study on the eating habits of the golden-capped parakeets, the birds were noted to primarily ignore the exocarp and mesocarp or outer layers of the fruits in order to eat the seeds within. Among the food ingested by the parakeets, the researchers observed the parakeets to eat various plant materials from West Indian Elms (Guazuma Ulmifolia), maize (Zea mays), silk floss trees (Ceiba speciosa), common guavas (Psidium guajava), pterogynes (Pterogynes nitens), and chinaberry trees (Melia azedarach). In addition, the growing anthropogenic landscape surrounding the A. auricapillus's habitat has led to an increase in the consumption of cultivated exotic seeds and fruits including citruses, papaya, mango, and maize.

== Status ==
Though observed to be in decline due to deforestation based on data recorded in affected areas, golden-capped parakeets are more commonly found outside primary forests and have a distribution of population throughout Guyana, Brazil, and Paraguay. During a 2018 published survey of local bird species in Minas Gerais, Brazil, golden-capped parakeets received an Occurrence Frequency of "Frequent" throughout the region, and other surveys reporting sightings in the Chapada Diamantina National Park and the Serra de Ouricana have revealed that the Aratinga auricapillus' small population relatively manages to maintain its numbers. Conservation efforts targeted towards parrots and protection of its habitat have also helped slow the decline, but a continued concern over the possibility of poachers who capture exotic birds as pets and habitat loss to livestock, coffee, sugarcane, and soybean farms keeps the Aratinga auricapillus in the least concern category on the IUCN's red list.
