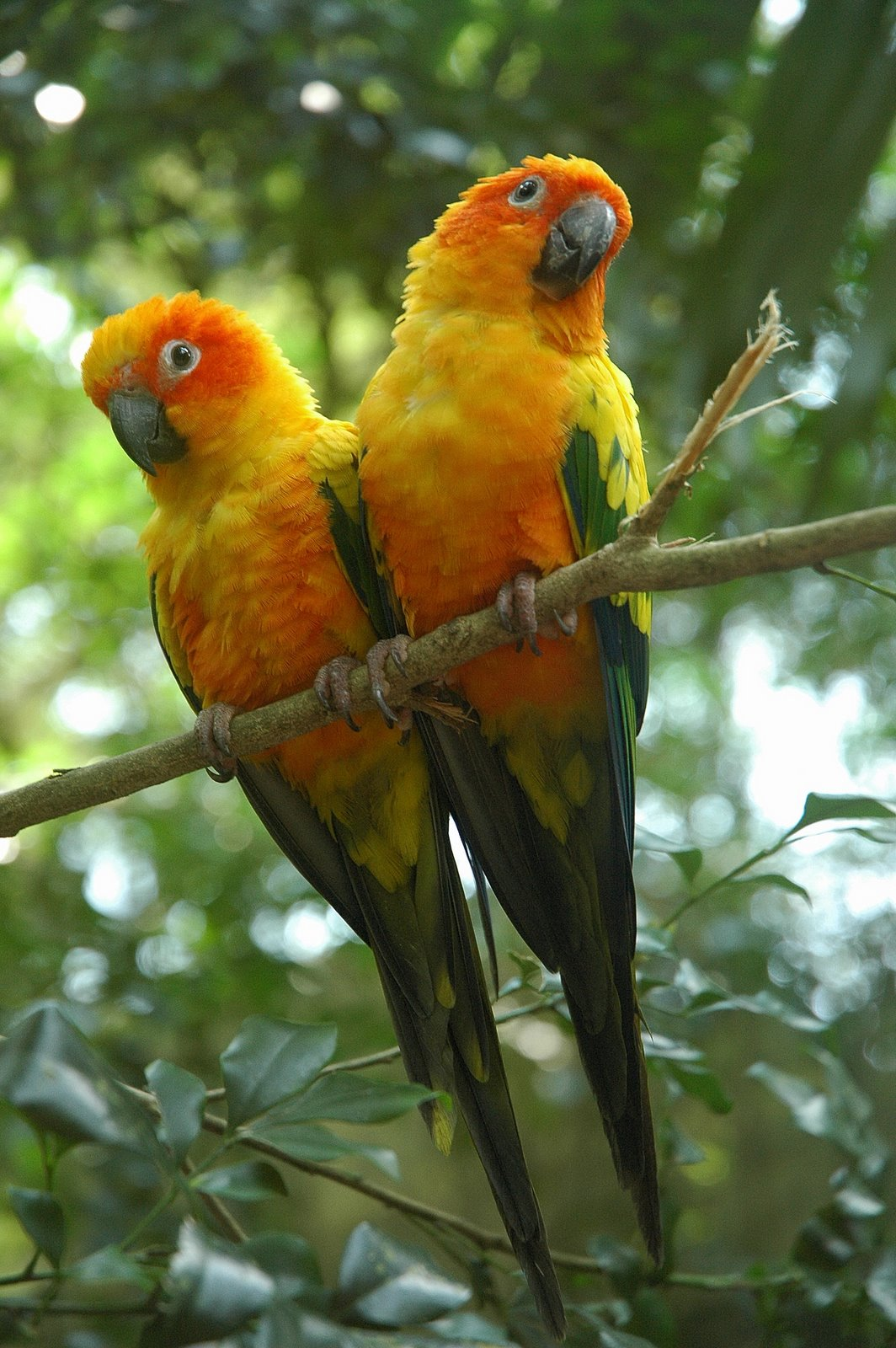

Conservation status
- Endangered (IUCN 3.1)

Scientific classification
- Kingdom: Animalia
- Phylum: Chordata
- Class: Aves
- Order: Psittaciformes
- Family: Psittacidae
- Genus: Aratinga
- Species: A. solstitialis

Binomial name
- Aratinga solstitialis (Linnaeus, 1758)

Synonyms
- Psittacus solstitialis Linnaeus, 1758

= Sun conure =

Species of bird

The sun conure (Aratinga solstitialis), also known as the sun parakeet, is a medium-sized, vibrantly colored parrot native to northeastern South America. The adult male and female are similar in appearance, with black beaks, predominantly golden-yellow plumage, orange-flushed underparts and face, and green and blue-tipped wings and tails. Sun conures are very social birds, typically living in flocks. They form monogamous pairs for reproduction, and nest in palm cavities in the tropics. Sun conures mainly feed on fruits, flowers, berries, blossoms, seeds, nuts, and insects. Conures are commonly bred and kept in aviculture and may live up to 30 years. This species is currently threatened by loss of habitat and trapping for plumage or the pet trade. Sun conures are now listed as endangered by the International Union for Conservation of Nature.

== Taxonomy ==
The sun conure was one of the many species originally described by Carl Linnaeus in his landmark 1758 10th edition of Systema Naturae. As Linnaeus did with many of the parrots he described, he placed this species in the genus Psittacus, but it has since been moved to the widely accepted Aratinga, which contains a number of similar New World species, while Psittacus is now restricted to the type species, the grey parrot and the closely related Timneh parrot. The specific epithet solstitialis is derived from the Latin for 'of the summer solstice', hence 'sunny', and refers to its golden plumage. The two widely used common names are "sun conure", used in aviculture, by the World Parrot Trust and some authorities such as Thomas Arndt and Joseph Forshaw, and "sun parakeet" as used by the American Ornithologists' Union and widely by official birdlists, field guides, and birders. However, this is the only species of "conure" that is regularly referred to as such in ornithological circles; most others are called "parakeets" by authorities.

The sun conure is monotypic, but the Aratinga solstitialis complex includes three additional species from Brazil: jandaya parakeet, golden-capped parakeet, and sulphur-breasted parakeet. These have all been considered subspecies of the sun conure, but most recent authorities maintain their status as separate species. Alternatively, the sun conure and the sulphur-breasted parakeet have been suggested to represent one species, while the jandaya parakeet and golden-capped parakeet represent a second. Of these, the sulphur-breasted parakeet only received widespread recognition in 2005, having gone unnoticed at least partially due to its resemblance to certain preadult plumages of the sun conure. The sun, jandaya, and golden-capped parakeets all can interbreed in captivity (the sulphur-breasted also likely will interbreed with these). In the wild, hybrids between the jandaya parakeet and golden-capped parakeet have been reported in their limited area of contact, but most such individuals could be subadults (which easily could be confused with hybrids). As far as known, the remaining taxa are entirely allopatric, although the sun conure and the sulphur-breasted parakeet possibly come into contact in the southern Guianas, where some doubts exist over their exact identity.

The sun conure and its congeners in Aratinga are the closest living relatives of the extinct Carolina parakeet. As such, sun conure DNA has been sequenced for comparative purposes to study the Carolina parakeet genome. The two species last shared a common ancestor about 3 million years ago, coinciding with the closure of the Isthmus of Panama, which allowed easier dispersal of species between North and South America.

== Description ==
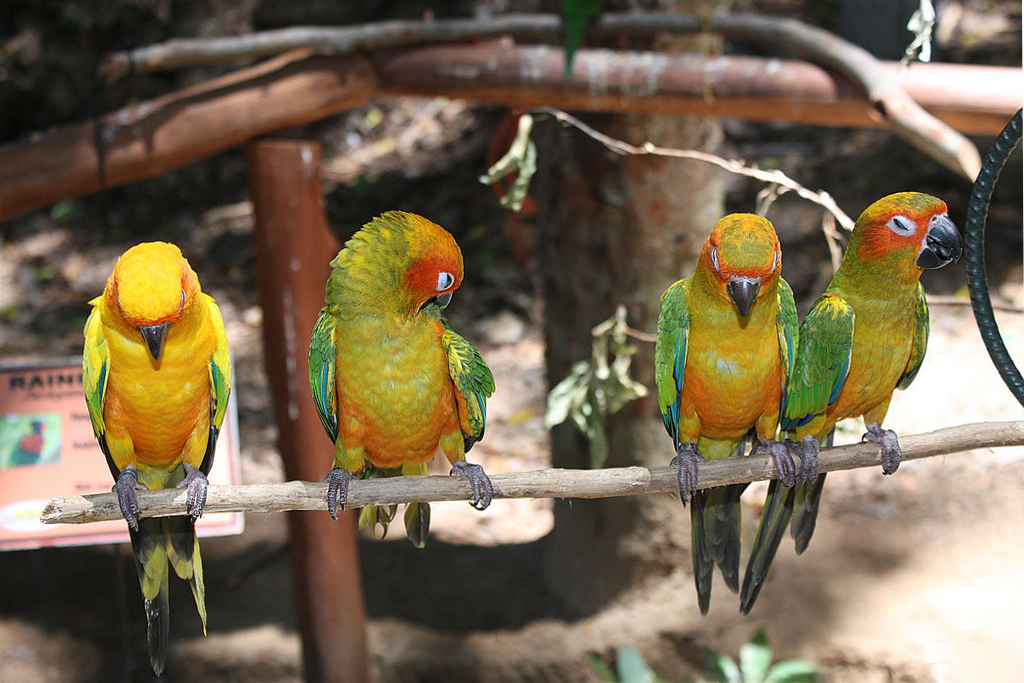
Adult on the left and three juveniles on the right

On average, sun conures weigh around 110 g (4 oz) and are around 30 cm (12 in) long. The sexes are similar in plumage, although hens may be lighter and slenderer in body, having a shorter tail, with a smaller, rounder head and a smaller beak. Adults have a rich yellow crown, nape, mantle, lesser wing coverts, tips of the greater wing coverts, chest, and underwing coverts. The face and belly are orange with red around the ears. The base of the greater wing coverts, tertials, and base of the primaries are green, while the secondaries, tips of the primaries, and most of the primary coverts are dark blue. The tail is olive-green with a blue tip. From below, all the flight feathers are dark greyish. The bill is black. The legs and the bare eye ring are grey, but the latter often fades to white in captivity (so using amount of grey or white in the eye ring for determining "purity" of an individual can be misleading). It is easily confused with the closely related jandaya parakeet and sulphur-breasted parakeet, but the former has entirely green wing coverts, mantle, and vent, while the latter has green mottling to the mantle and less orange to the underparts. The sun conure is also superficially similar to the pale-billed golden parakeet.

Juvenile sun conures display a predominantly green plumage and resemble similarly aged sulphur-breasted parakeets. The distinctive yellow, orange, and reddish colouration on the back, abdomen, and head is attained with maturity.

== Distribution and habitat ==
Sun conures live in a relatively small region of northeastern South America – the north Brazilian state of Roraima, southern Guyana, extreme southern Suriname, and southern French Guiana. They also occur as vagrants to coastal French Guiana. Their status in Venezuela is unclear, but recent sightings from the southeast near Santa Elena de Uairén have been reported. They may occur in Amapá or far northern Pará (regions where the avifauna generally is very poorly documented), but this remains to be confirmed. Populations found along the Amazon River in Brazil are now known to belong to the sulphur-breasted parakeet.

Sun conures are mostly found in tropical habitats, but their exact ecological requirements remain relatively poorly known. They are widely reported as occurring within dry savanna woodlands and coastal forests, but recent sightings suggest they mainly occur at altitudes less than 1,200 m (3,900 ft), at the edge of humid forests growing in foothills in the Guiana Shield, and cross more open savannah habitats only when traveling between patches of forest. Sun conures have been seen in shrublands along the Amazon riverbank, as well as forested valleys and coastal, seasonally flooded forests. These conures usually inhabit fruiting trees and palm groves.

== Behavior ==
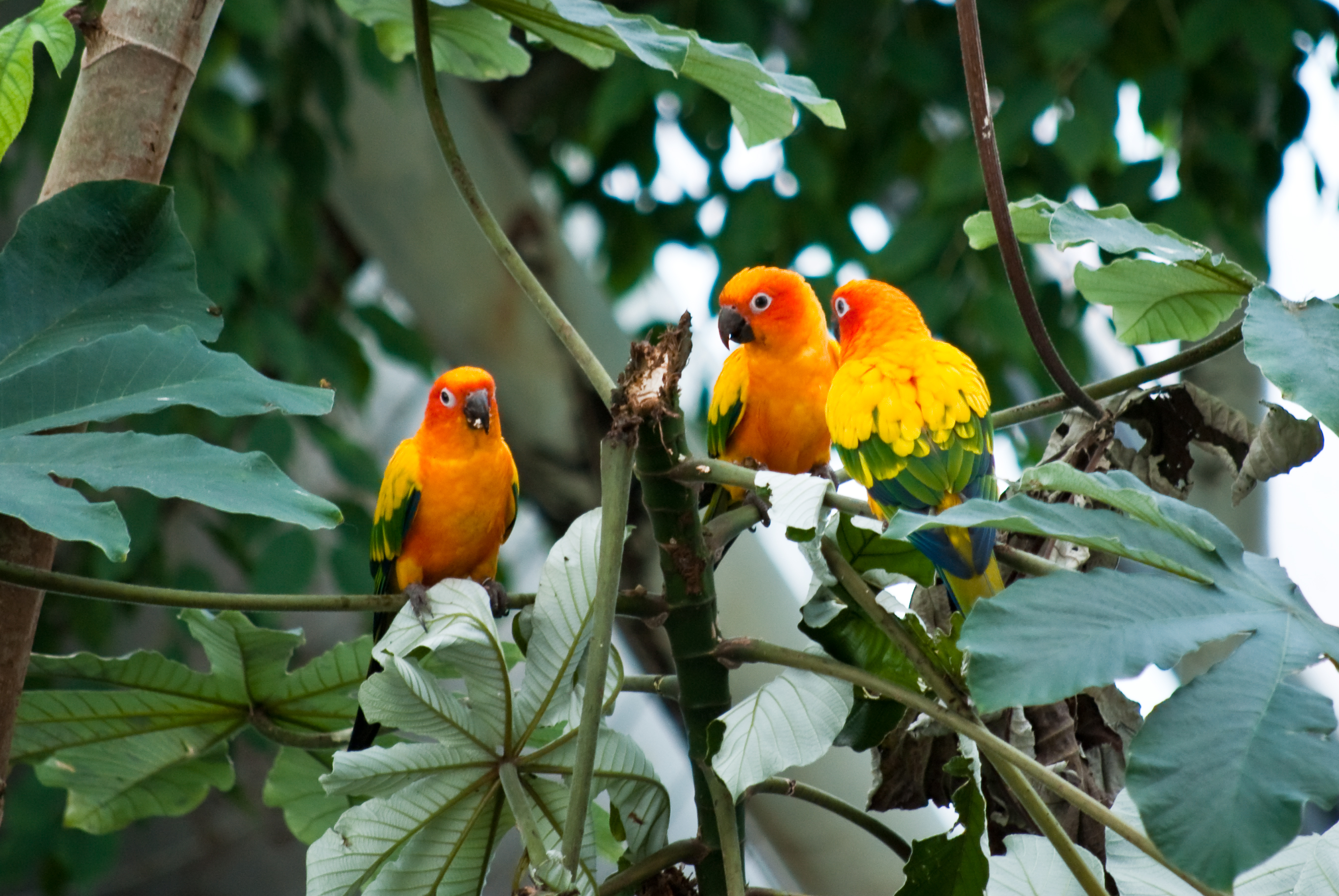
A group of sun conures

Like other members of the genus Aratinga, the sun conure is very social and typically occurs in large flocks of 15 to 30 individuals. They rarely leave the flock, but when they get separated from the group, they squawk and scream in a high-pitched voice, which can carry for hundreds of yards, allowing individuals to communicate with their flock and return to them. Flocks are relatively quiet while feeding, but are known to be very vocal and make loud noises when in flight. They can travel many miles in a single day, and they are fast, direct flyers. Nonverbal communication is also practised, with a variety of physical displays. Birds within a flock rest, feed one another, preen, and bathe throughout the daylight hours. They move through the trees using their beaks for extra support. They also have the ability to use their feet like hands to help hold, examine, or eat items. Sun conures have been reported to nest and roost in tree cavities. When in molt, conures are uncomfortable, so are easily irritable. Bathing, warm rainfalls, and humidity allow the sheaths of each pin feather to open more easily and lessen their discomfort. Sun conures are extremely smart and curious, so require constant mental stimulation and social interaction. Their speech and ability to learn tricks in captivity are quite moderate. Otherwise, relatively little is known about their behavior in the wild, in part due to confusion with the sulphur-breasted parakeet species. Regardless, the behavior of the two is unlikely to differ to any great extent.

== Diet ==
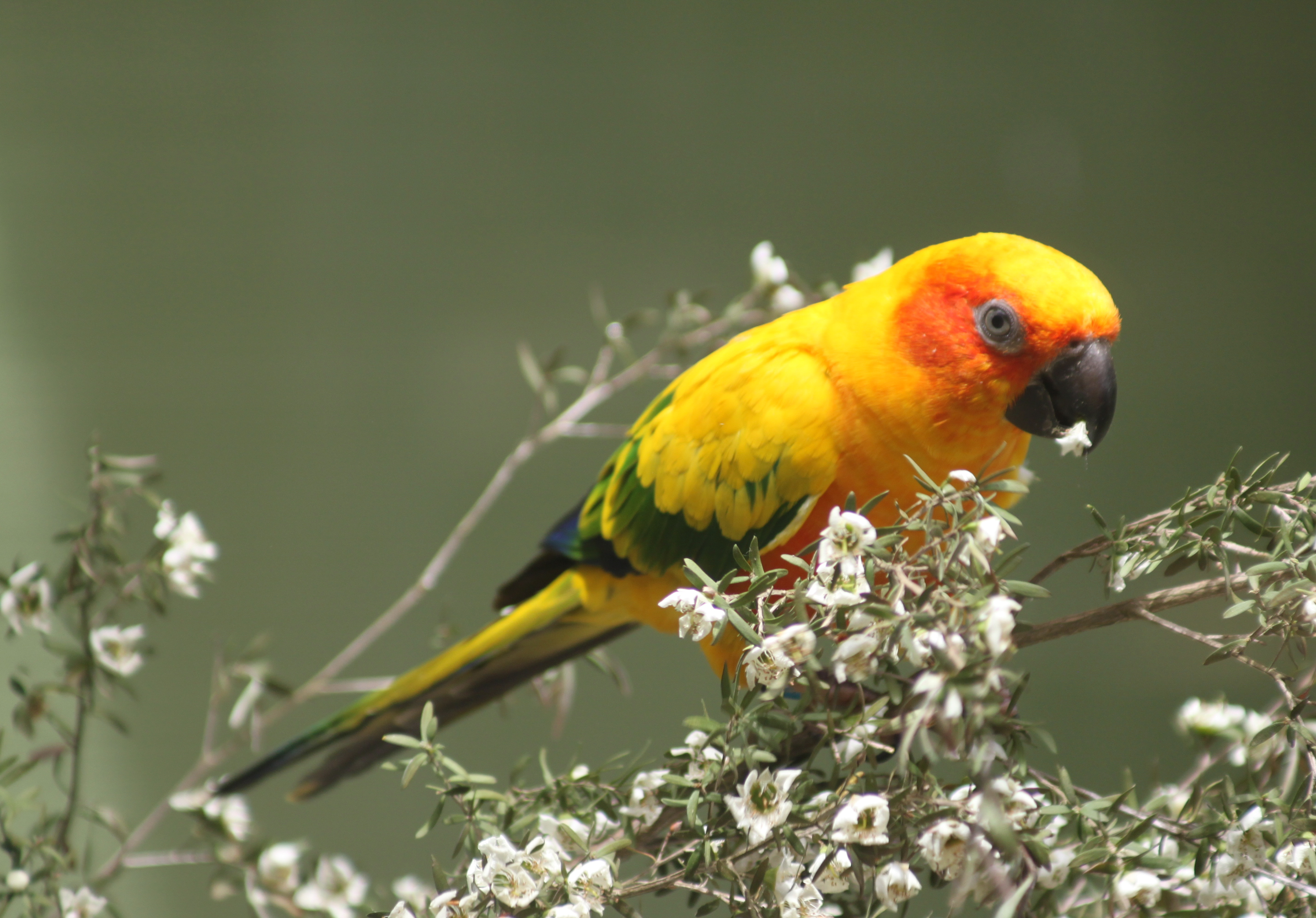
At Hamilton Zoo, New Zealand

In the wild, sun conures mainly feed on fruits, flowers, berries, blossoms, seeds, nuts, and insects. They feed on both ripe and half-ripe seeds of both fruits and berries. They also consume red cactus fruit, Malpighia berries, and legume pods. Sun conure flocks near Karasabai have commonly been observed feeding upon monkey brush plants, with their colourful plumage serving as camouflage against the red and yellow flowers while eating. At times, they forage from agricultural crops and may be considered pests. They require more protein intake during breeding season, more carbohydrates when rearing young, and more calcium during egg production.

== Reproduction ==
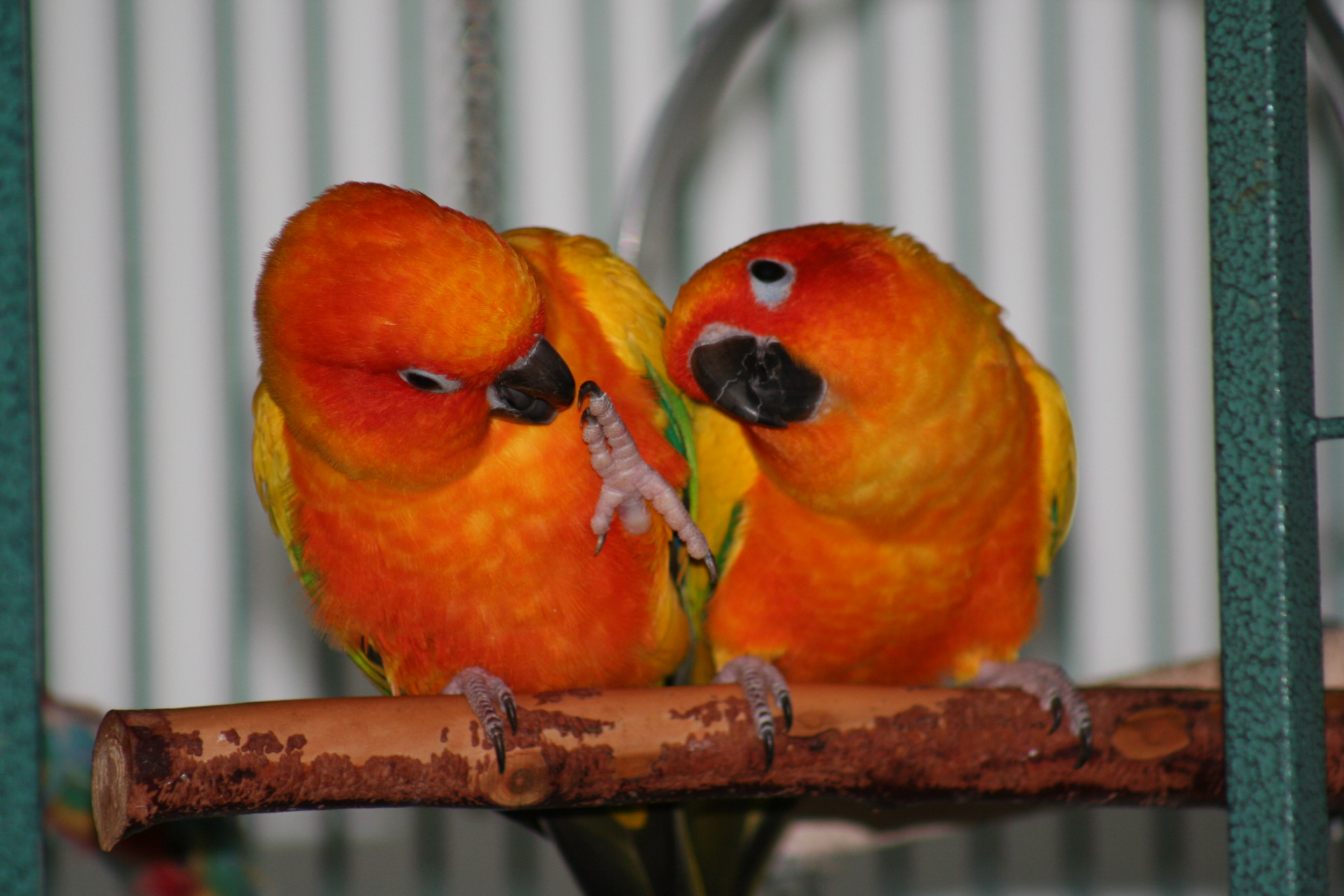
A pair of sun conures

Young sun conures form monogamous pairs around 4 to 5 months of age. Prior to breeding, they may be seen feeding and grooming one another. Mating can last up to three minutes, after which pairs become very affectionate with each other. Prior to egg laying, the female's abdomen noticeably swells. They have been known to nest in trees or in cavities of Mauritia flexuosa palms. Active conure nests have been observed to contain multiple adults, as well as eggs and young birds of various ages and it may be the case that the species engages in cooperative breeding, with eggs and chicks being present in nests from January to October. Fertility rate of sun conures is relatively high. Typical clutch size is three or four white eggs, and they may be laid in two- to three-day intervals. Pairs may only destroy and eat their eggs in cases of calcium deficiency. Females are responsible for the entire incubation period from 23 to 27 days, and only leave the nest for short feeding periods. Males aggressively protect the nest from potential predators. Eggs may fail to hatch if they are not kept warm or if the hatchling fails to break through the shell successfully, which may take from a few hours to a few days. Chicks are born blind, naked, and completely vulnerable. Only after 10 days, they begin to open their eyes and their feather quills break through. Both parents participate in feeding the chicks. The young depend on their parents for 7 to 8 weeks after hatching, and only become independent after 9 to 10 weeks. Conures are sexually mature around 2 years of age and have a lifespan ranging from 25 to 30 years.

== Status ==
Sun conures are currently classified as Endangered on the IUCN Red List, with their population having declined rapidly due to excessive capture for the pet trade. It is estimated that more than 20,000 individuals were exported for the pet trade to Singapore alone from 2005 – 2006. The total remaining population in the wild is estimated to be less than 2,500 individuals as of 2021. Now, more sun conures are living in people's homes than in the wild. The United States, Australia, and European Union have banned the import of wild birds in 1992, 1995, and 2005, respectively, and in these places, captive-breeding has largely replaced the demand for wild-caught individuals. However, the international parrot trade remains a lucrative industry.

The species has declined between 50 – 79% across its range in the Roraima state of Brazil over the past two decades, though its small remaining population in Guyana is showing signs of recovery due to intense conservation action. Today, it is regularly bred in captivity, but the poaching of wild individuals remains a serious threat.

== Aviculture ==
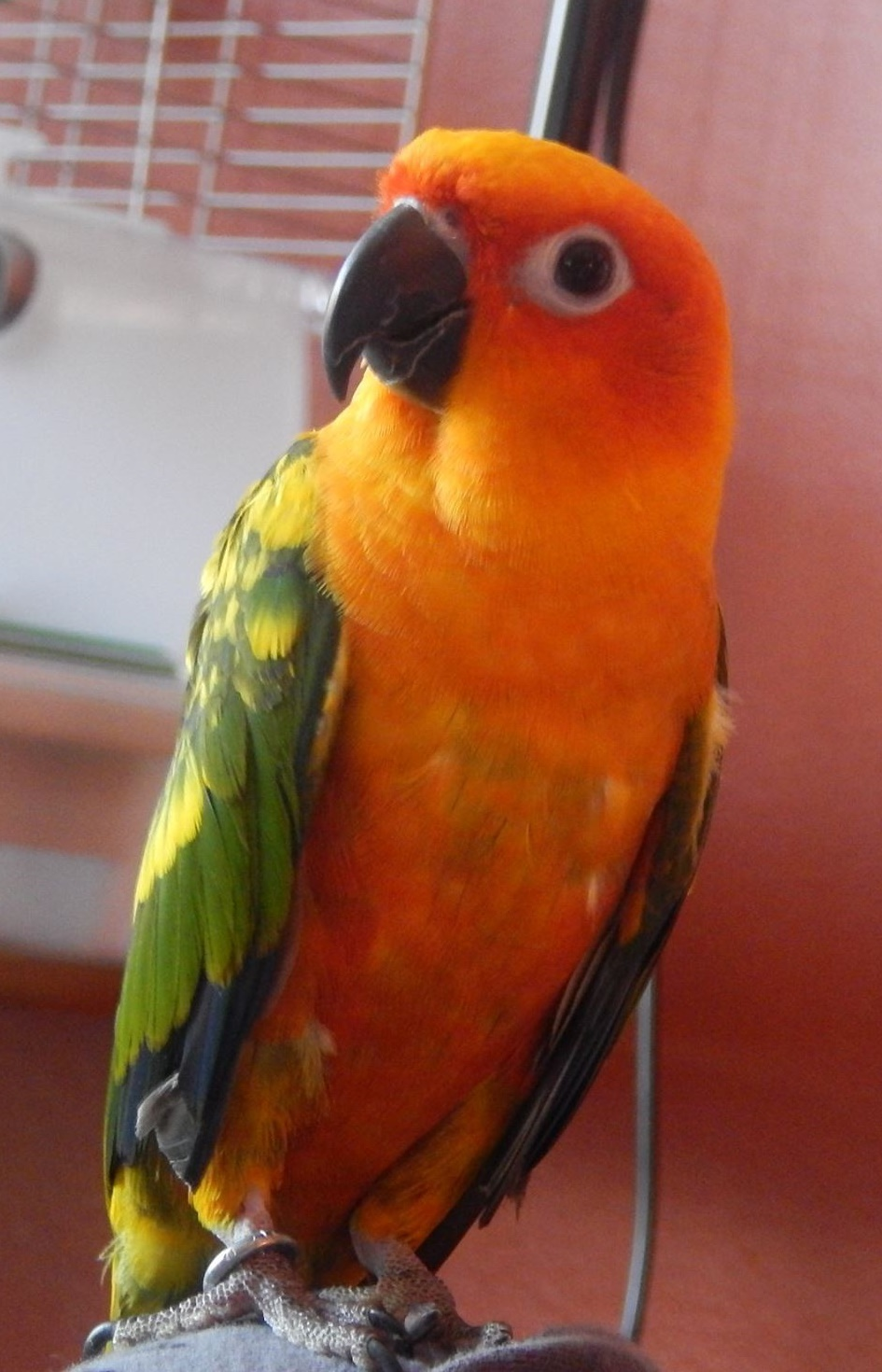
A young female sun conure hatched in captivity

The sun conure is noted for its very loud squawks and screams compared to its relatively small size, and have been recorded reaching over 120 decibels. It is capable of mimicking humans, but not as well as some larger parrots. It is popular as a pet because of its bright coloration and curious nature. Due to its inquisitive temperament, it demands a great deal of attention from owners, with whom it can be loving and cuddly. Hand-reared pets can be very friendly towards people with whom they are familiar, but they may be aggressive with strangers and even territorial with visitors. Sun conures are capable of learning many tricks and can even perform in front of a live audience. They enjoy listening to music, to which they occasionally sing and dance. Like many parrots, they are determined chewers and require toys and treats on which to chew. Other activities enjoyed by sun conures include taking baths and preening feathers. Many owners clip their conures' wings, but this is not necessary if the proper precautions are put in place. Due to environmental hazards, conures should not be allowed to fly unsupervised. Sun conures are great candidates for outdoor flight when well trained, as they are loyal, but risk potential must be minimized. In captivity, their lifespans range from 15 to 30 years.

Other colour mutations of the Sun Conure have been produced in aviculture.

A red-factor colour mutation has been produced in aviculture. Originating in Hawaii in the early 2000s, this mutation results in the parakeet's normal yellowish plumage being replaced by a deep reddish-orange, the intensity of which varies from individual to individual. The genetics and inheritance mode of the mutation are poorly understood at present and some red-factor birds that exhibit extremely reddish color fail to thrive, display health problems, and die within months of hatching, with brain and spleen abnormalities apparent upon autopsy.

Another colour mutation that has been produced in aviculture is referred to in bird communities as the "Pied" or "High Yellow" sun conure. This mutation results in the green and blue feathers usually present on the sun conure (wings & tail) to be reduced (or entirely missing) and replaced by yellow (sometimes near white) plumage.
