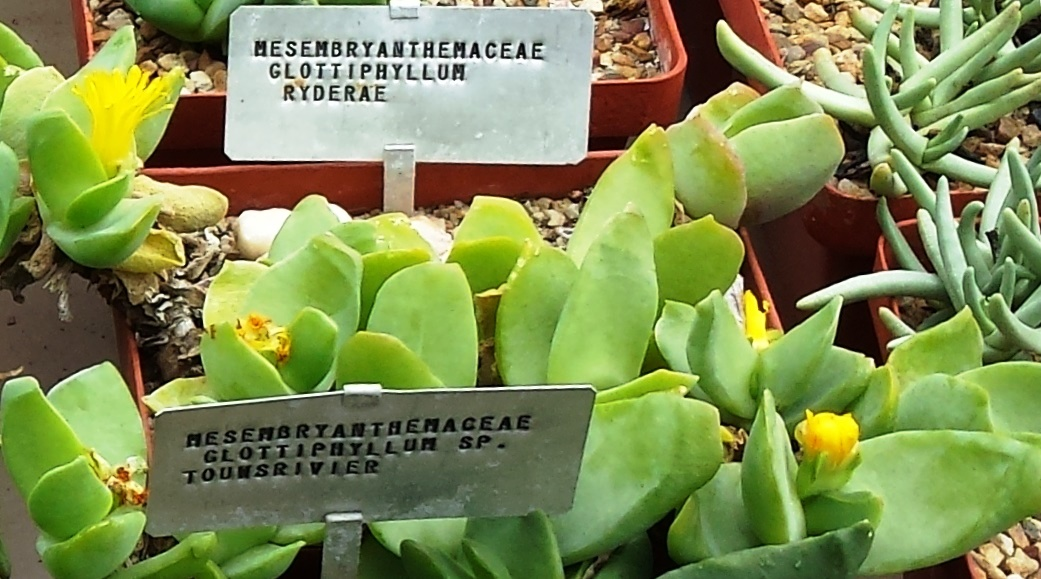
- Glottiphyllum linguiforme in cultivation

Scientific classification
- Kingdom: Plantae
- Clade: Tracheophytes
- Clade: Angiosperms
- Clade: Eudicots
- Order: Caryophyllales
- Family: Aizoaceae
- Genus: Glottiphyllum
- Species: G. linguiforme

Binomial name
- Glottiphyllum linguiforme (L.) N.E.Br.

= Glottiphyllum linguiforme =

Species of succulent

Glottiphyllum linguiforme is a widespread species of succulent plant, of the family Aizoaceae, native to South Africa. It is the type species of the genus Glottiphyllum.

== Description ==
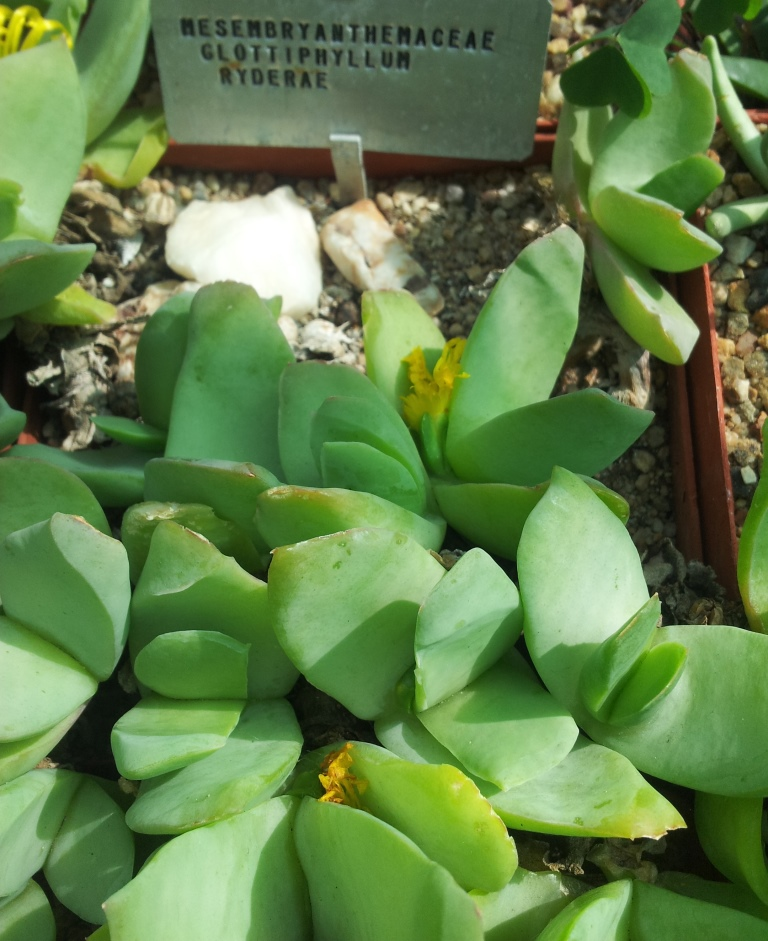
The distinctively short, fat, "tongue-shaped" leaves of G. linguiforme, some still showing their pale, waxy covering

This plant's species name means "tongue-shaped" in Latin, and refers to the appearance of the short, fleshy leaves. Its leaves are compact, smooth and oval, without any strong markings or apical hunches.

The leaf surface has a pale waxy covering that can easily be rubbed off, and the lower part of the leaf is flat.

It resembles Glottiphyllum carnosum, which looks similar but has thicker leaves with hunched tips, and tends of offset and branch far more.

== Distribution and habitat ==
It is indigenous to the central part of the arid Little Karoo near the town of Oudtshoorn, Western Cape Province, South Africa. Here it co-occurs with the rare Glottiphyllum cruciatum and the widespread Glottiphyllum depressum. G.linguiforme usually grows on rocky, shale-based soils, in the shelter of bushes.
