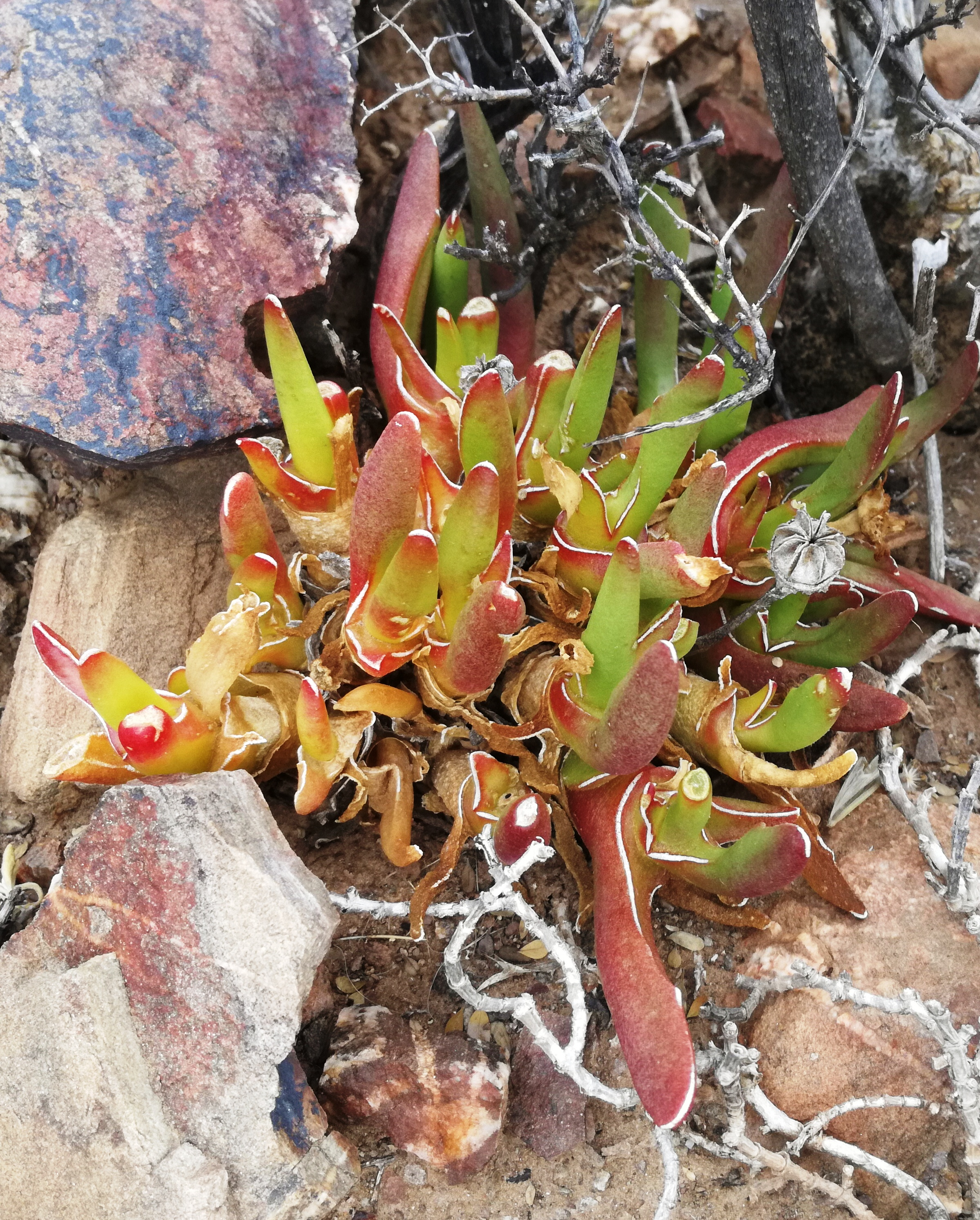
- Glottiphyllum peersii showing the typical white margins on its curved leaves

Scientific classification
- Kingdom: Plantae
- Clade: Tracheophytes
- Clade: Angiosperms
- Clade: Eudicots
- Order: Caryophyllales
- Family: Aizoaceae
- Genus: Glottiphyllum
- Species: G. peersii

Binomial name
- Glottiphyllum peersii L.Bolus

= Glottiphyllum peersii =

Species of succulent

Glottiphyllum peersii is a rare species of succulent plant, in the family Aizoaceae. It is indigenous to arid areas near Klaarstroom in the Western Cape, South Africa.

== Description ==
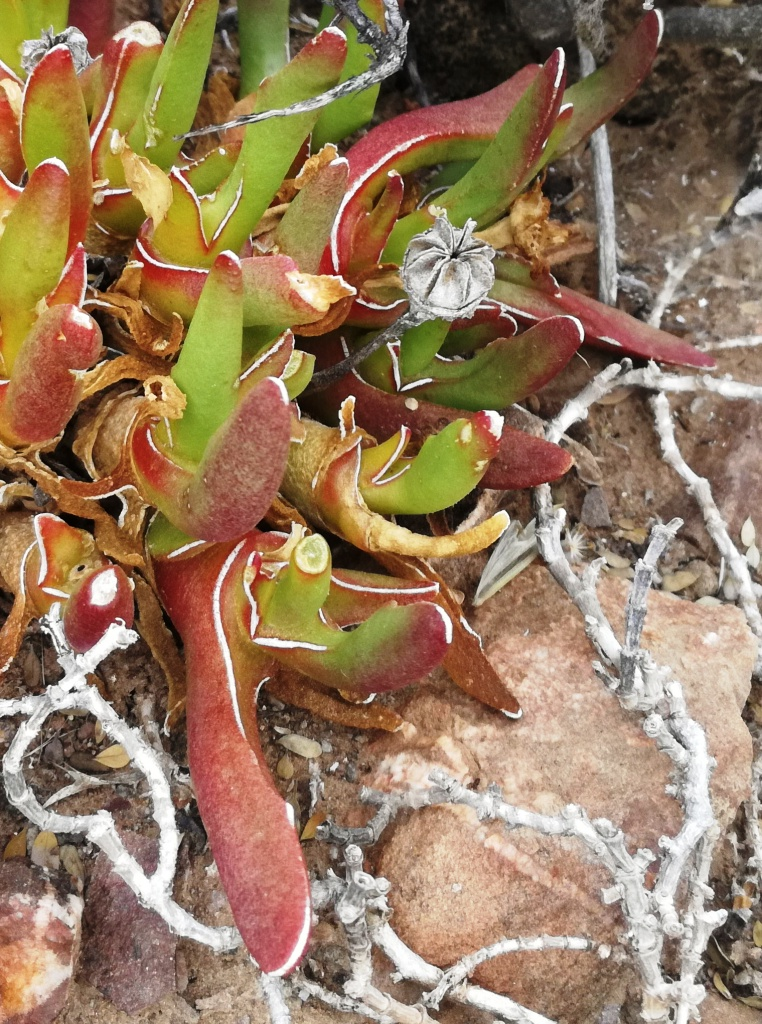
Detail of leaves and seed capsule

This species can be distinguished by its bright, white margins on its slender, upcurved leaves.

The leaves grow in pairs, that each appear in a decussate arrangement (each leaf-pair at right angles to the previous one, rather than all in the same two distichous rows). Each leaf-pair is also strongly anisophyllous (one leaf is much larger than the other). The larger leaf of each pair has a notch at its base, and the other is very much smaller.

It most resembles its close relative, Glottiphyllum difforme, that grows to the east. However G. difforme has leaves with large, broad teeth.
