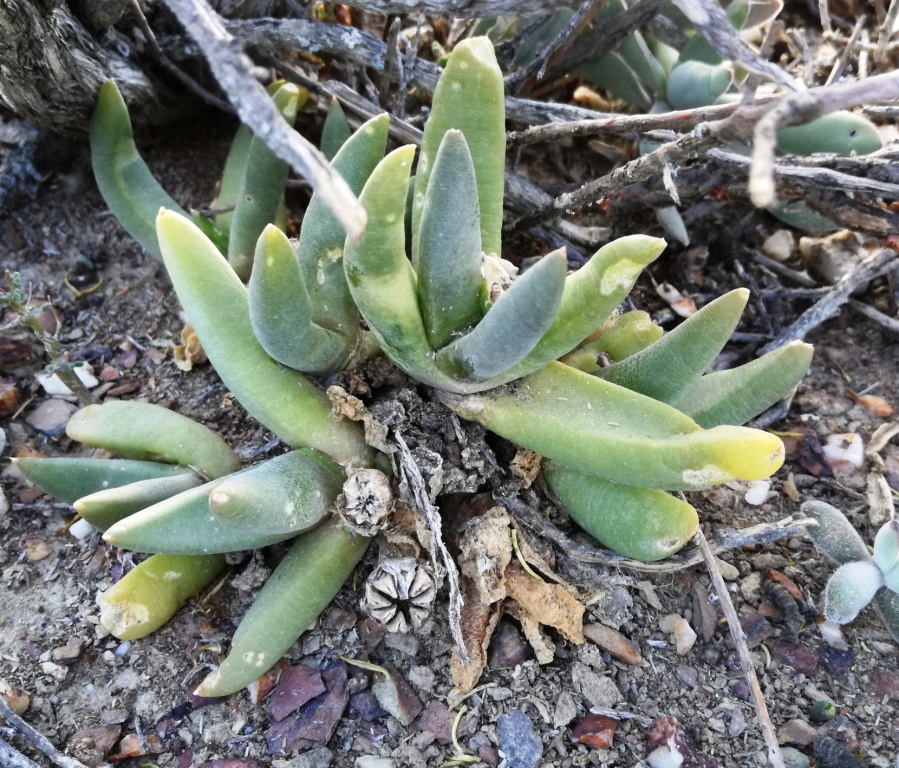
- Glottiphyllum fergusoniae, growing near Barrydale

Scientific classification
- Kingdom: Plantae
- Clade: Tracheophytes
- Clade: Angiosperms
- Clade: Eudicots
- Order: Caryophyllales
- Family: Aizoaceae
- Genus: Glottiphyllum
- Species: G. fergusoniae

Binomial name
- Glottiphyllum fergusoniae L.Bolus

= Glottiphyllum fergusoniae =

Species of succulent

Glottiphyllum fergusoniae is a species of succulent plant, of the family Aizoaceae. It is indigenous to the western part of the Little Karoo, in the Western Cape, South Africa.

== Description ==
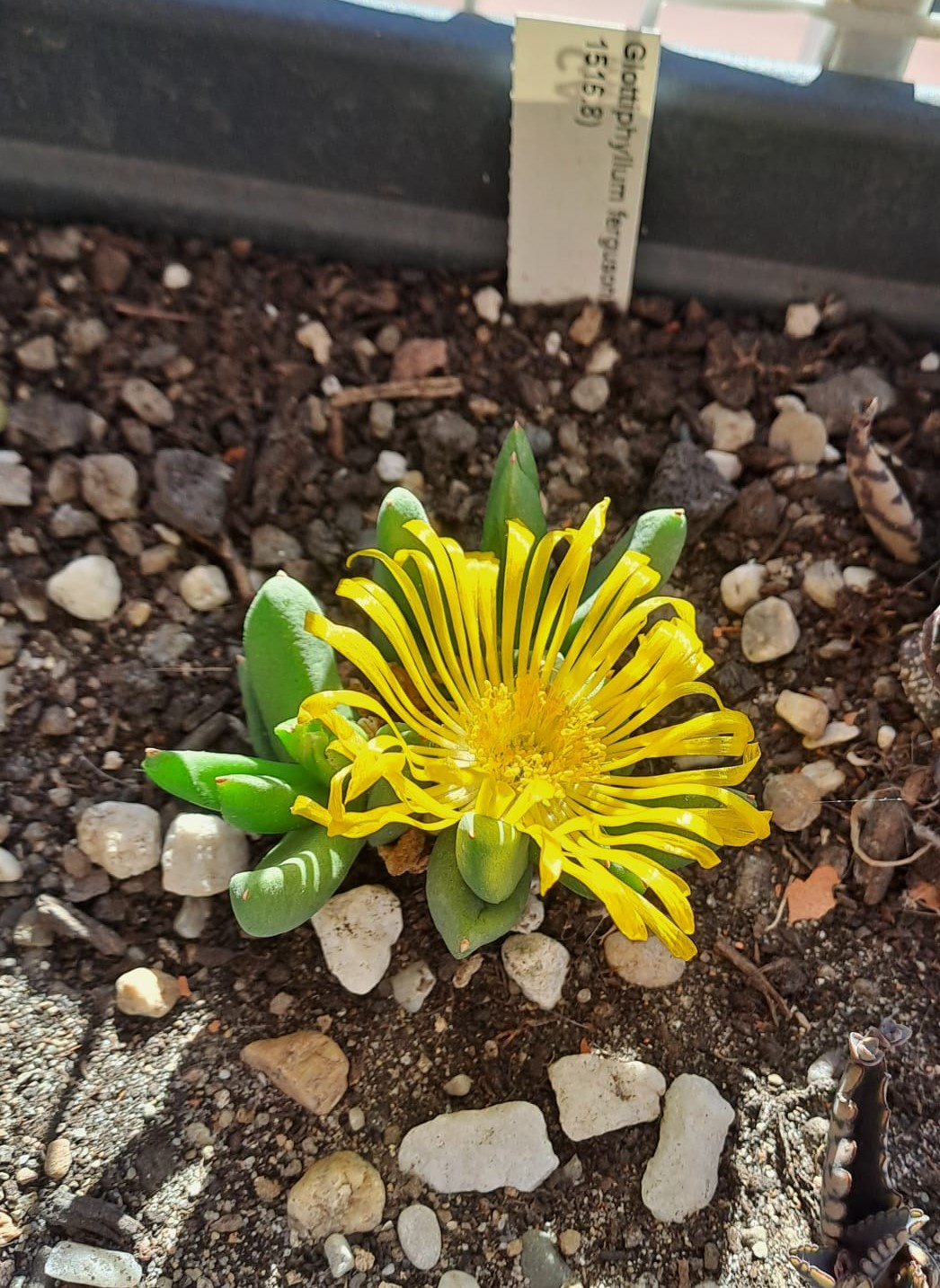
Flower of Glottiphyllum fergusoniae

The leaves are decussate (produced in alternate, perpendicular pairs) slender, erect and tapering gradually to a point. They are covered in a fine, pale waxy covering that gives the leaves a slight grey colour.

The seed capsule is held close to the plant, has valves with awns, and even after it has dried out and released its seeds, it remains persistent on the plant, for many years.

== Distribution and habitat ==
This species occurs in the western part of the Little Karoo, South Africa. It is often found around the towns of Barrydale and Montagu.

Here it grows exposed, in very rocky habitats, often in crevices. Glottiphyllum depressum, which co-occurs with it in the same areas, is found only on shadier, more sheltered spots, growing in deeper soils. A third species, Glottiphyllum suave occurs just to the north of its range, also in the western Little Karoo, has a pale waxy covering to its leaves, and favours exposed positions.
