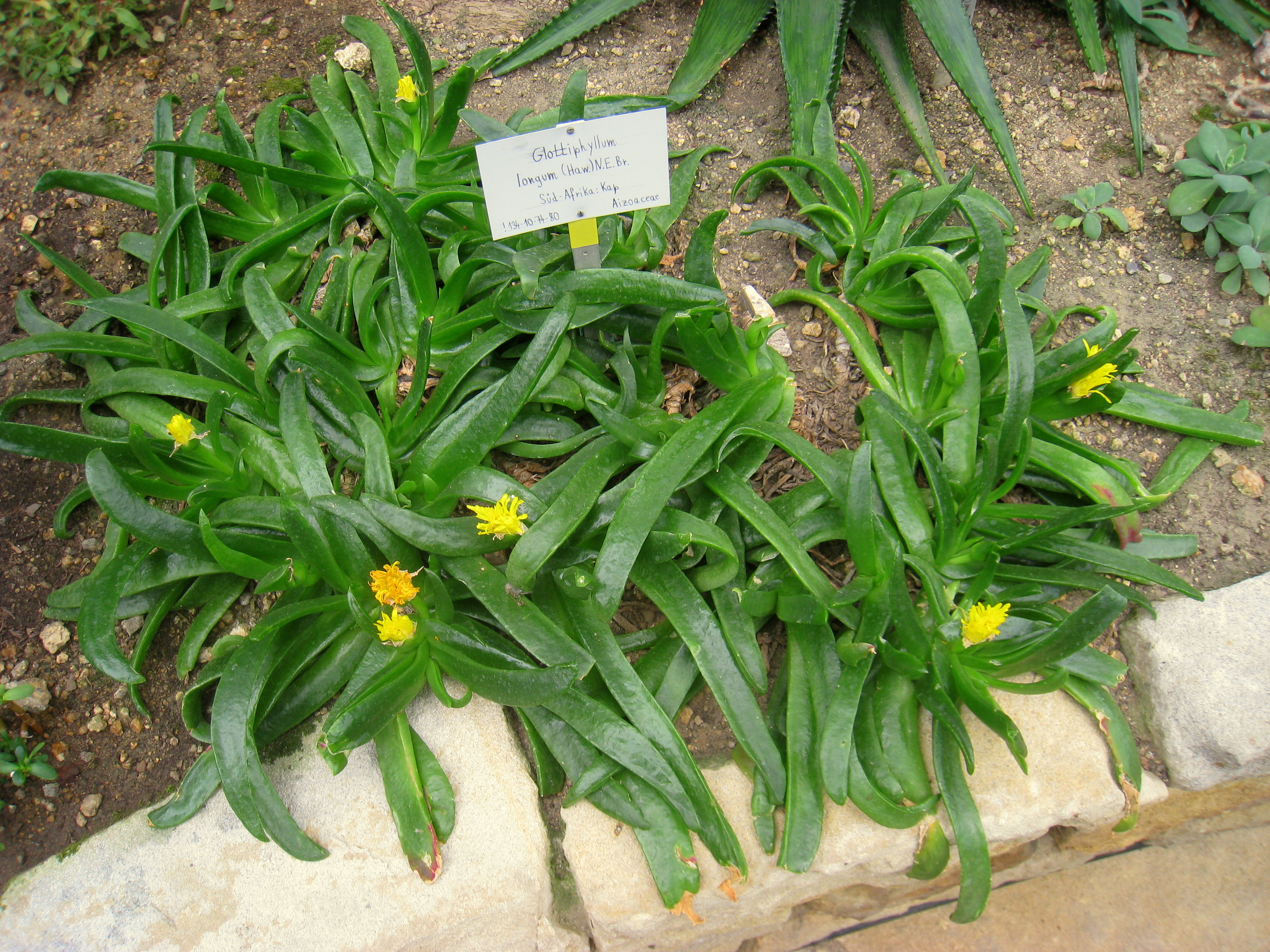
- The strap-shaped leaves of Glottiphyllum longum

Scientific classification
- Kingdom: Plantae
- Clade: Tracheophytes
- Clade: Angiosperms
- Clade: Eudicots
- Order: Caryophyllales
- Family: Aizoaceae
- Genus: Glottiphyllum
- Species: G. longum

Binomial name
- Glottiphyllum longum (Haw.) N.E.Br.

= Glottiphyllum longum =

Species of succulent

Glottiphyllum longum is a species of succulent plant in the family Aizoaceae, native to the Western Cape and Eastern Cape Provinces, South Africa.

It is the most widespread Glottiphyllum species, and the most common one in cultivation.

== Description ==
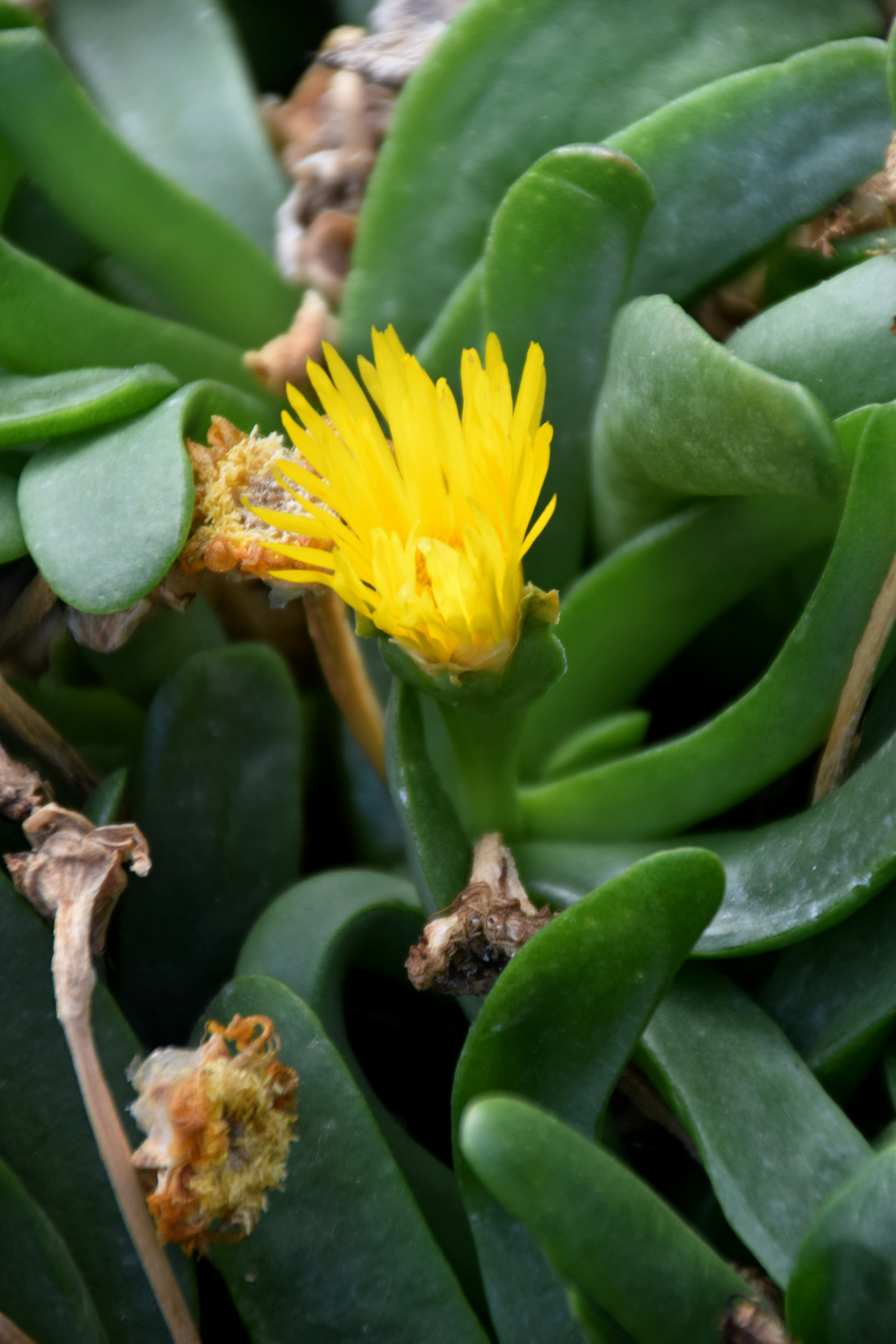
Detail of strap-shaped leaves and long fruiting stalks of G.longum.

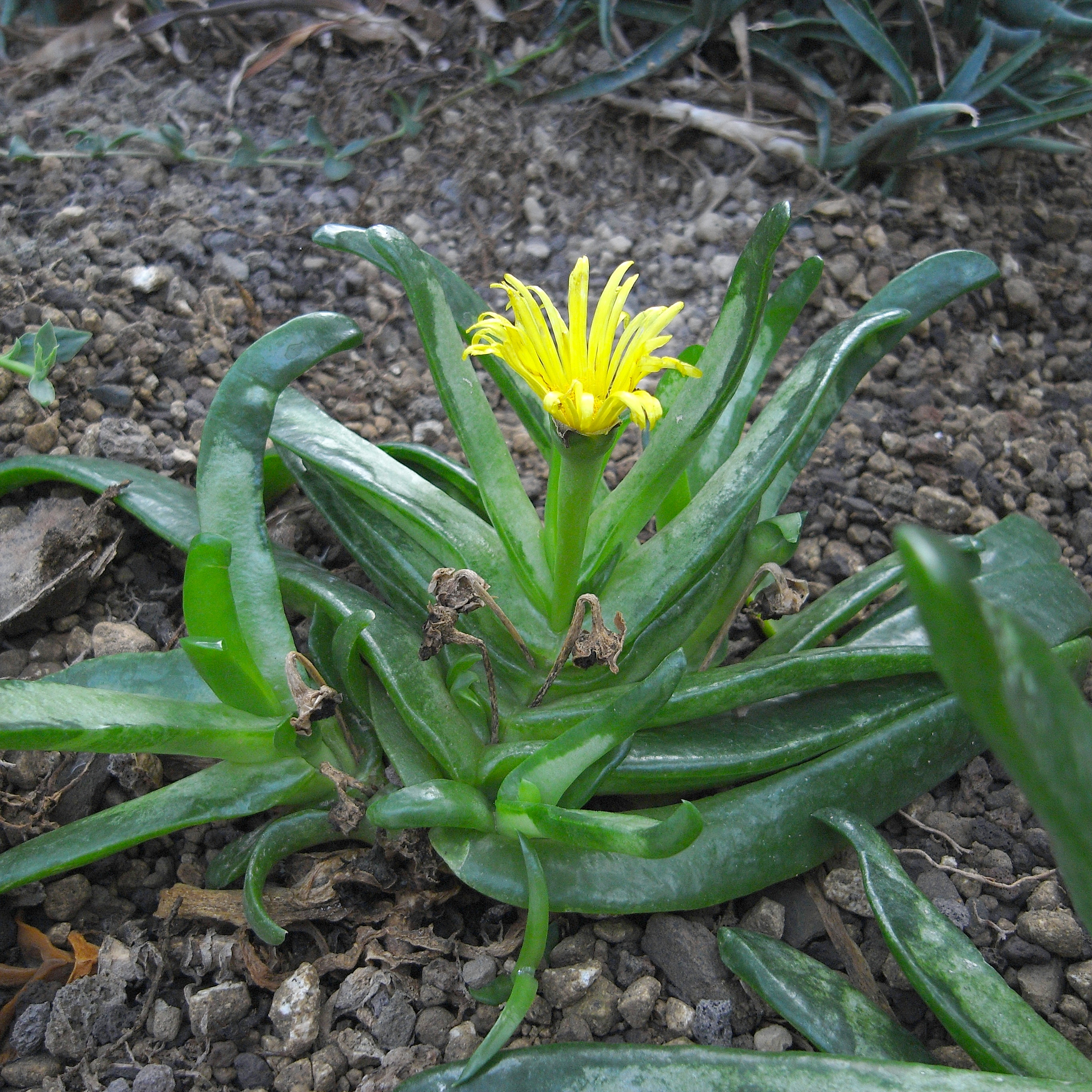
The leaves of G.longum are born in two opposite rows (distichous)

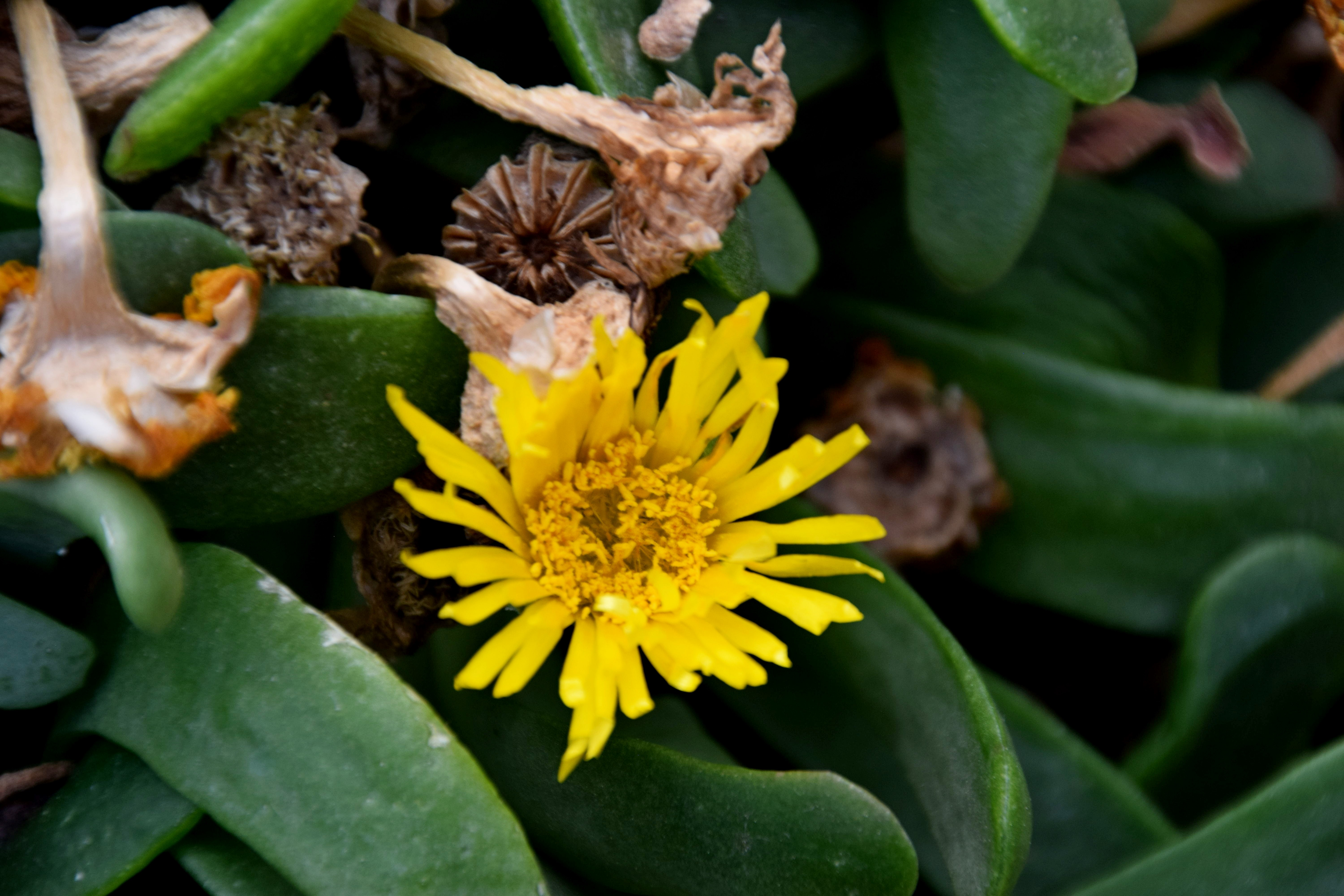
Flowers and seed capsules are born on long stalks, that remain on the plant for many years.

It can be distinguished from its relatives by the way that its flat, green, fleshy, tongue-shaped leaves are all born in two opposite rows (distichous), lying flat and mostly prostrate along the ground.

The long leaves are distinctively strap-shaped, with rounded margins. Sometimes they are also mildly curved or upturned at the tips, but not hooked. The bladder cells at the leaf margins are oriented horizontally and not elongated.

The fruits are born on long stalks. The seed capsules have 9 or more locules and persist on the stem for many years. The seeds are very small and smoothed on the sides.

=== Distinction from Glottiphyllum depressum ===
This species is sometimes confused with the similarly widespread Glottiphyllum depressum. However the flowers and fruits of G.depressum do not have long stalks and are therefore held closely against the stem. Its seed capsule also has a very soft, spongy base, and the whole capsule degrades and falls away soon after releasing its seed. The top of the seed capsule has very thick, raised valves in a tall dome, which is surrounded by a low inconspicuous rim.

In contrast, the flowers and fruits of G. longum are on long stalks, and remain on the plant for a long time.

The leaves of G.longum are also often longer. Glottiphyllum depressum has more clearly hooked depressions on its leaves, which are also often slightly more erect. The cell walls of its leaves' bladders cells are undulated.

== Distribution ==
This is the most widespread and common species in the entire genus Glottiphyllum. It occurs in shrubby thicket, on loamy-sandy soil, from near Ceres in the west, throughout the Little Karoo and Overberg regions, as far as the Albany region of the Eastern Cape. Here, in the far eastern part of its range, it co-occurs with the species that it also most resembles, its close relative Glottiphyllum grandiflorum.

== Synonyms ==
- Glottiphyllum cultratum (Salm-Dyck) N.E.Br.
- Glottiphyllum davisii L.Bolus
- Glottiphyllum erectum N.E.Br.
- Glottiphyllum latum N.E.Br.
- Glottiphyllum latum N.E.Br. var. cultratum (Salm-Dyck) N.E.Br.
- Glottiphyllum longum (Haw.) N.E.Br. var. hamatum N.E.Br.
- Glottiphyllum longum (Haw.) N.E.Br. var. heterophyllum (Haw.) G.D.Rowley
- Glottiphyllum obliquum (Willd.) N.E.Br.
- Glottiphyllum propinquum N.E.Br.
- Glottiphyllum pustulatum (Haw.) N.E.Br.
- Glottiphyllum uncatum (Haw.) N.E.Br.
- Mesembryanthemum adscendens Haw.
- Mesembryanthemum angustum Haw. var. heterophyllum Haw.
- Mesembryanthemum cultratum Salm-Dyck
- Mesembryanthemum latum Haw.
- Mesembryanthemum linguiforme auct.
- Mesembryanthemum linguiforme L. var. adscendens (Haw.) A.Berger
- Mesembryanthemum linguiforme L. var. cultratum (Salm-Dyck) A.Berger
- Mesembryanthemum linguiforme L. var. depressum (Haw.) A.Berger
- Mesembryanthemum linguiforme L. var. longum (Haw.) A.Berger
- Mesembryanthemum linguiforme L. var. obliquum (Willd.) A.Berger
- Mesembryanthemum linguiforme L. var. pustulatum (Haw.) A.Berger
- Mesembryanthemum linguiforme L. var. uncatum (Haw.) A.Berger
- Mesembryanthemum longum Haw.
- Mesembryanthemum longum Haw. var. uncatum Haw.
- Mesembryanthemum lucidum Haw.
- Mesembryanthemum medium Haw.
- Mesembryanthemum obliquum Willd.
- Mesembryanthemum pustulatum Haw.
- Mesembryanthemum pustulatum Haw. var. lividum Salm-Dyck
- Mesembryanthemum uncatum (Haw.) Salm-Dyck
