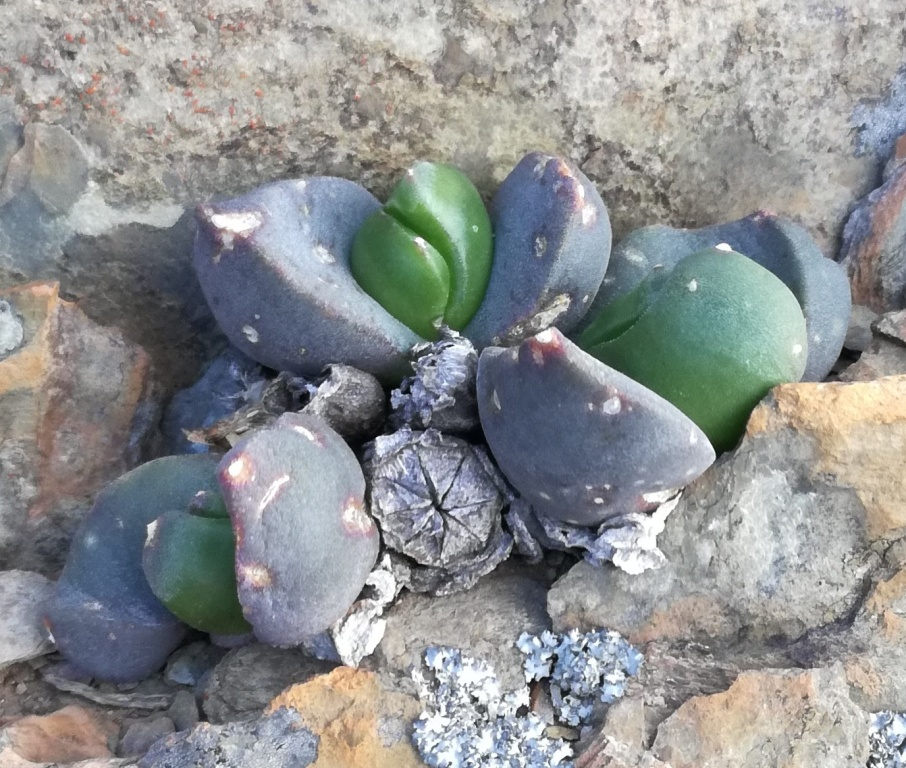

Scientific classification
- Kingdom: Plantae
- Clade: Tracheophytes
- Clade: Angiosperms
- Clade: Eudicots
- Order: Caryophyllales
- Family: Aizoaceae
- Genus: Glottiphyllum
- Species: G. suave

Binomial name
- Glottiphyllum suave N.E.Br.

= Glottiphyllum suave =

Species of succulent

Glottiphyllum suave is a species of succulent plant, in the family Aizoaceae. It is indigenous to arid areas of the western Little Karoo, in the Western Cape, South Africa.

== Description ==
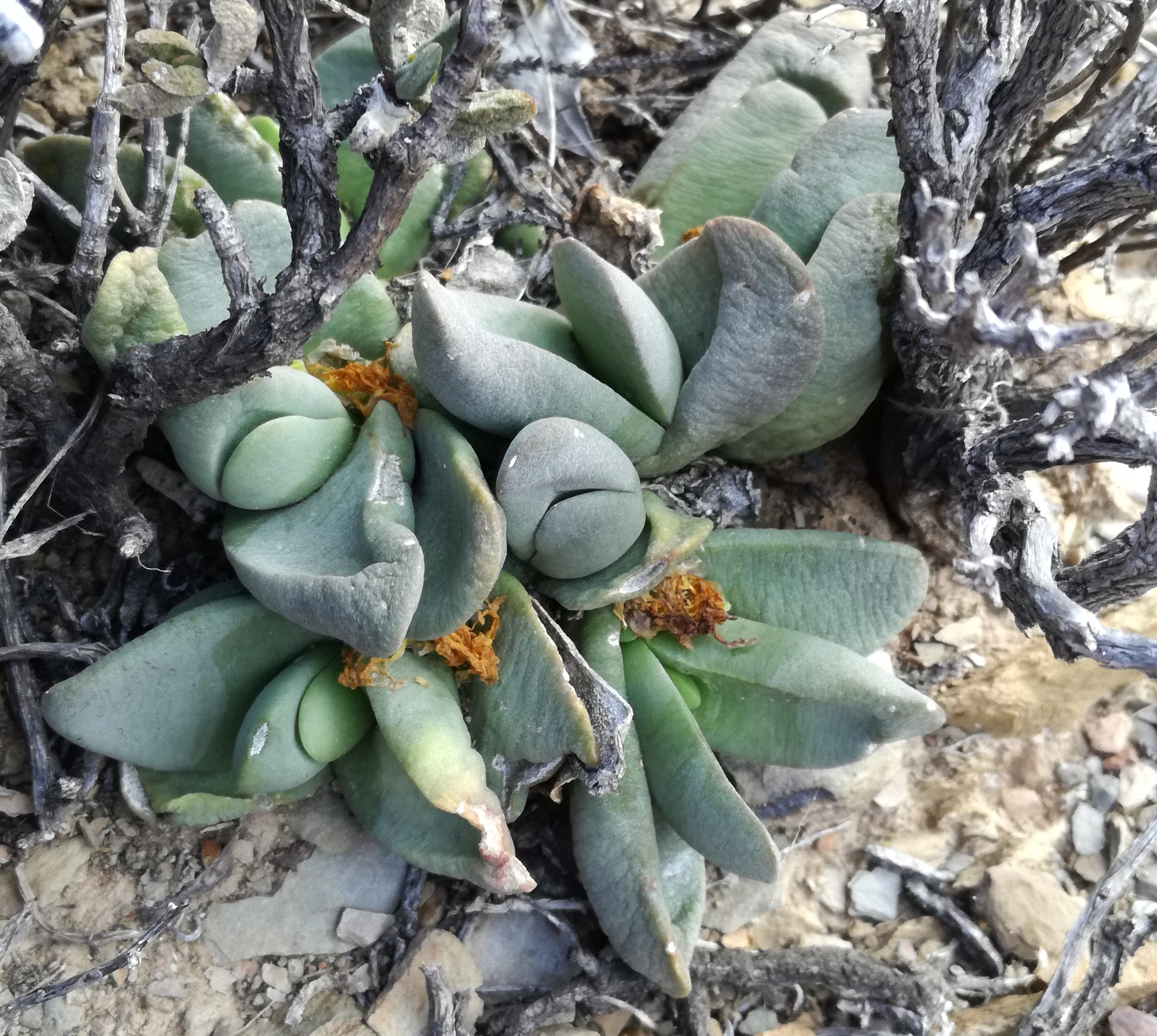
Large specimen showing the typical grey-green distichous leaves

Each growth point bears a small number of compact, fleshy leaves, in two parallel, opposite rows (distichous leaf arrangement).

The leaves of this species are thick, oval or rounded-elliptical, and ending in a slightly hunched "chin". The leaves also have clear margins and a pale waxy covering that can easily be rubbed off. This layer of white wax gives the leaves a slightly blue-grey hue. It is likely an adaptation to this plant's habitat preference for exposed positions in full sunlight.

The seed capsule disintegrates and falls from the plant soon after it has released its seeds. The seeds have long, equally-sized papillae.

== Distribution ==
Glottiphyllum suave is indigenous to the western Little Karoo, west of Ladismith, in the Western Cape Province, South Africa.

Its range extends from the Anysberg area in the west to as far east as near Vanwyksdorp. In this region, it usually grows exposed, in full sun. In much of its range, it co-occurs with its common relative Glottiphyllum depressum (which usually grows in the shelter of bushes). In the south of its range, it overlaps with the range of Glottiphyllum fergusoniae, and in the east of its range, with Glottiphyllum surrectum.
