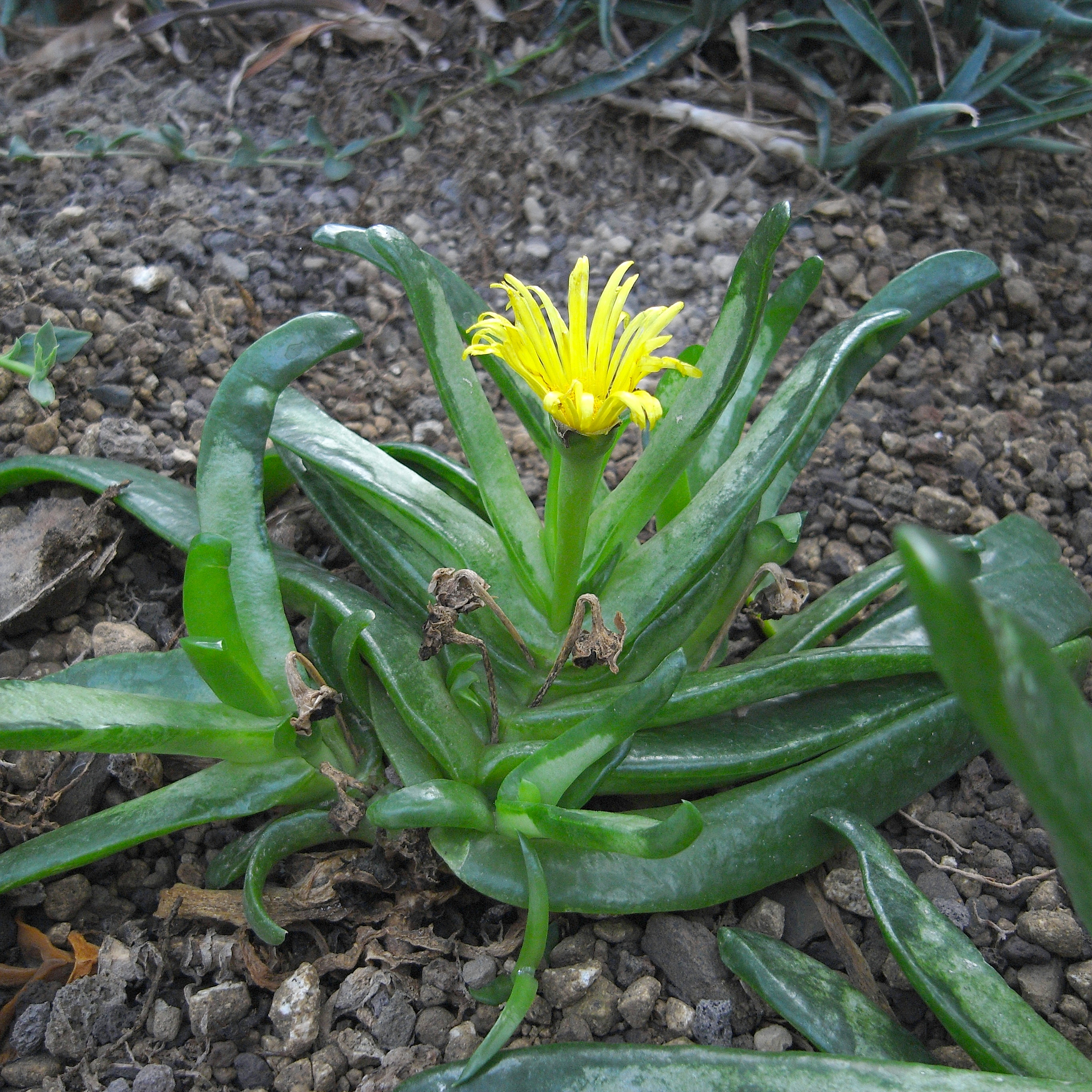
- Glottiphyllum longum

Scientific classification
- Kingdom: Plantae
- Clade: Tracheophytes
- Clade: Angiosperms
- Clade: Eudicots
- Order: Caryophyllales
- Family: Aizoaceae
- Subfamily: Ruschioideae
- Tribe: Ruschieae
- Genus: Glottiphyllum; Haw. (1821)

Species
- See text

= Glottiphyllum =

Genus of succulents

Glottiphyllum is a genus of about 57 species of succulent subtropical plants of the family Aizoaceae. It is closely related to the Gibbaeum and Faucaria genera. The name comes from ancient Greek γλωττίς glottis "tongue" and φύλλον phyllon "leaf". The species are native to South Africa, specifically to Cape Province and the Karoo desert. They grow in rocks and soils incorporating slate, sandstone and quartz. Rainfall in their native areas is between 125 and 500 mm (4.9 and 19.7 in), most of which falls in March and November.

== Description ==
Glottiphyllum plants have thick, soft leaves arranged in pairs that are low to the ground and often graze the soil surface. They also have rhizomes. They sport yellow flowers with narrow petals in the autumn and winter. The flowers are sometimes fragrant and around 5 cm in diameter. The species readily interbreed, making hybridization easy.

== Species ==
Glottiphyllum species accepted by the Plants of the World Online as of November 2022:[1]

- Glottiphyllum carnosum N.E.Br.
- Glottiphyllum cruciatum (Haw.) N.E.Br.
- Glottiphyllum depressum (Haw.) N.E.Br.
- Glottiphyllum difforme (L.) N.E.Br.
- Glottiphyllum fergusoniae L.Bolus
- Glottiphyllum grandiflorum (Haw.) N.E.Br.
- Glottiphyllum linguiforme (L.) N.E.Br.
- Glottiphyllum longum (Haw.) N.E.Br.
- Glottiphyllum neilii N.E.Br.
- Glottiphyllum nelii Schwantes
- Glottiphyllum oligocarpum L.Bolus
- Glottiphyllum peersii L.Bolus
- Glottiphyllum regium N.E.Br.
- Glottiphyllum salmii (Haw.) N.E.Br.
- Glottiphyllum suave N.E.Br.
- Glottiphyllum surrectum (Haw.) L.Bolus

== Culture ==
Glottiphyllum plants can be grown in small pots in poor soil with sand and clay. They require full sun, and need moderate watering in summer and none in winter (during which the plant undergoes a necessary rest period). If overwatered, the plants become deformed.

== Gallery of species ==
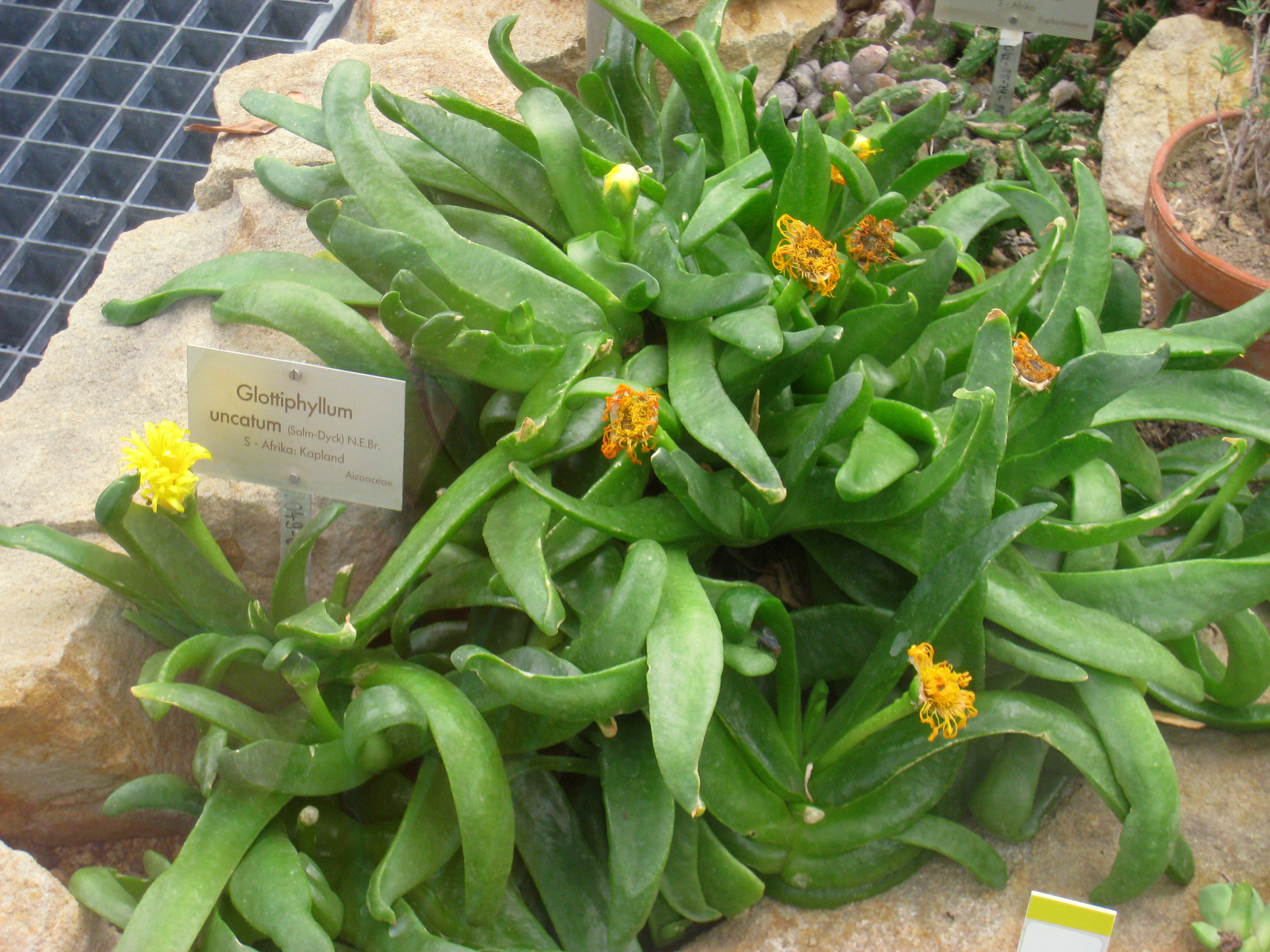
Glottiphyllum longum

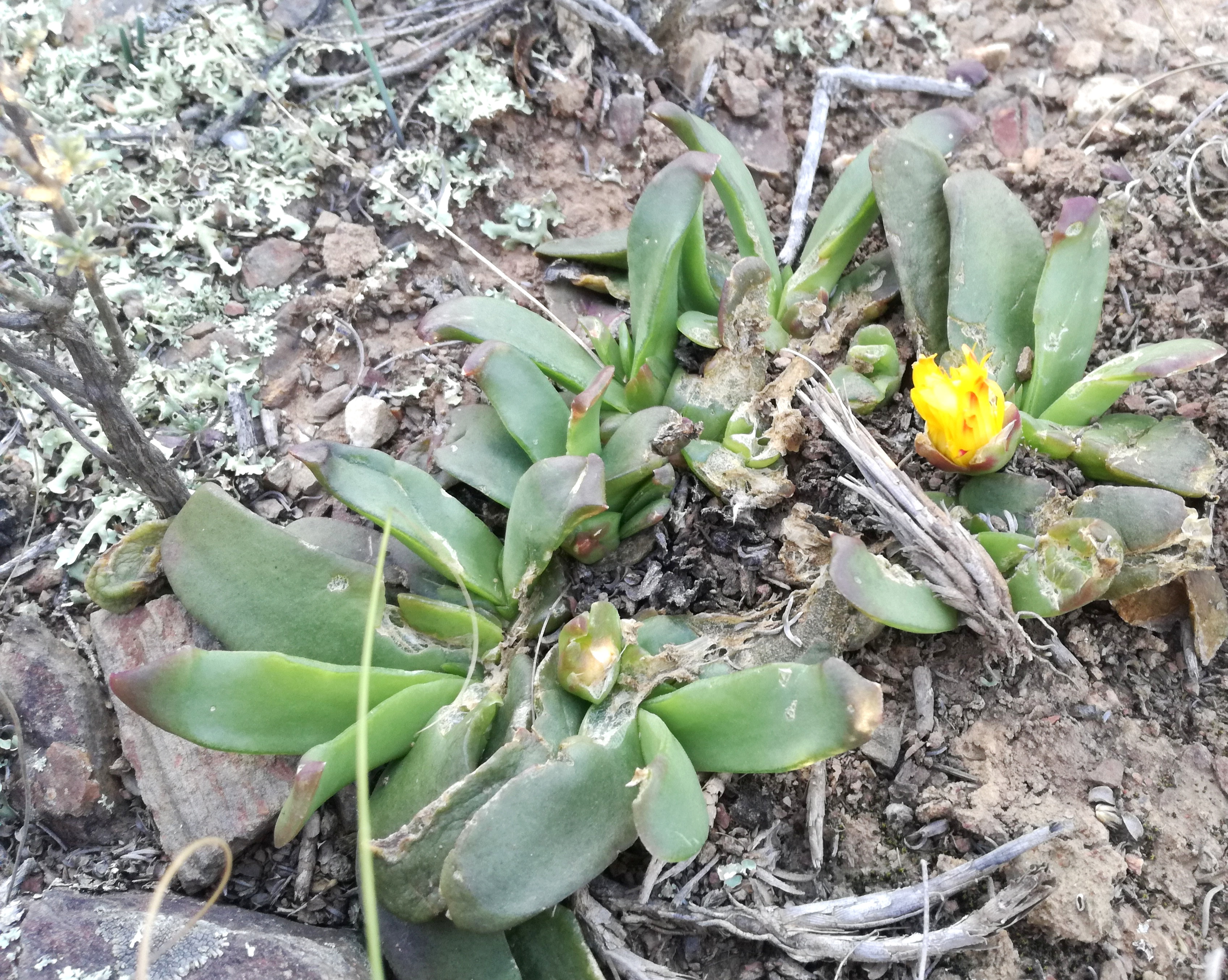
Glottiphyllum depressum

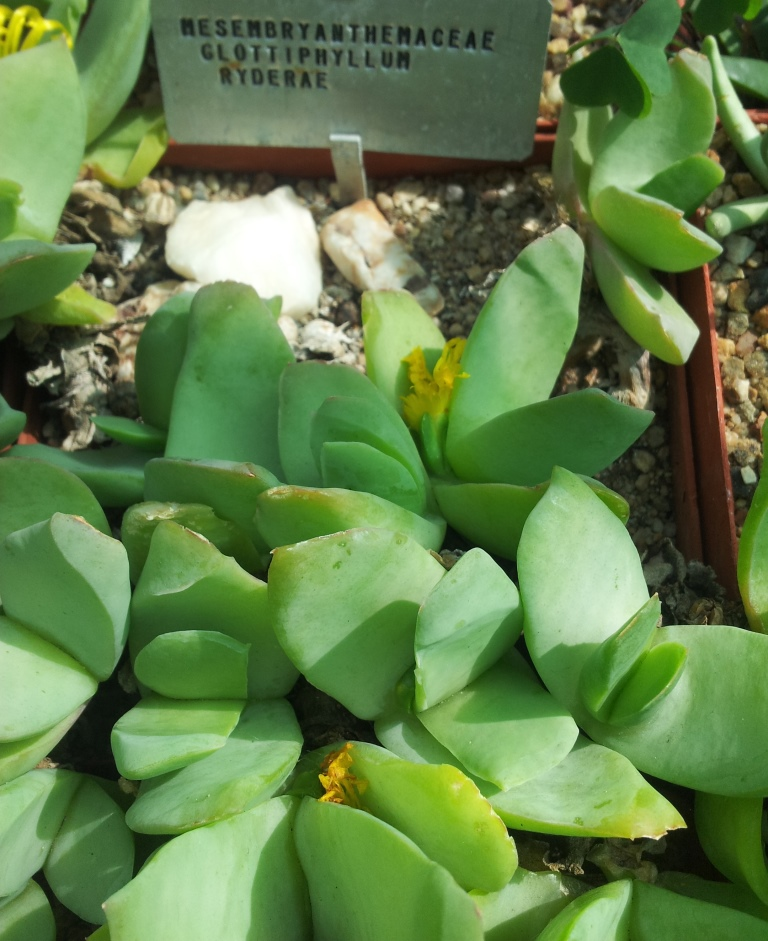
Glottiphyllum linguiforme

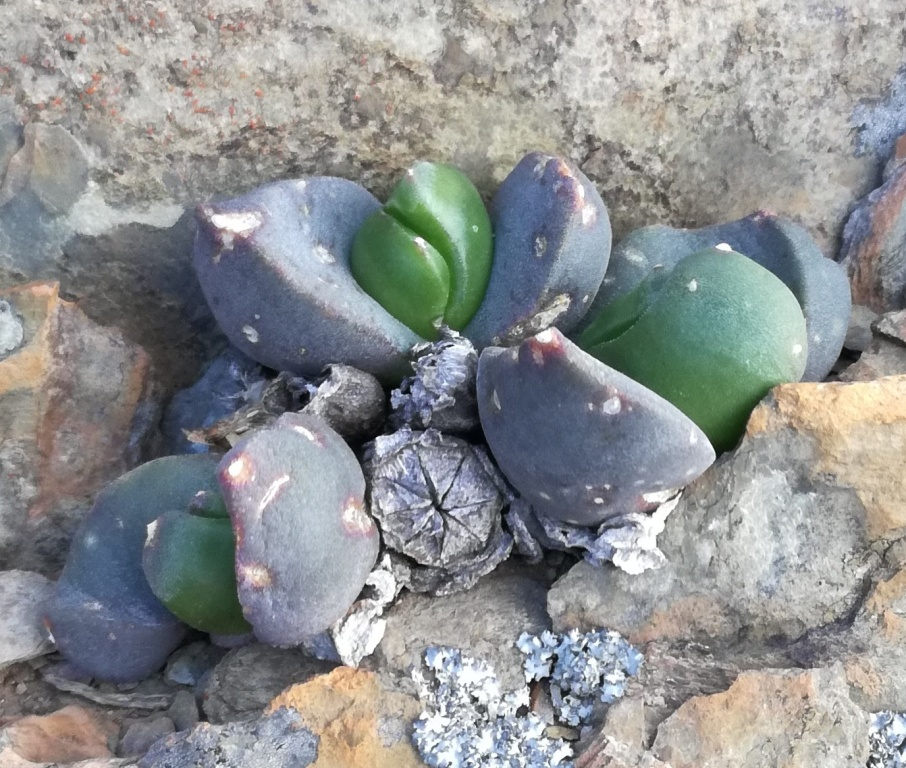
Glottiphyllum suave

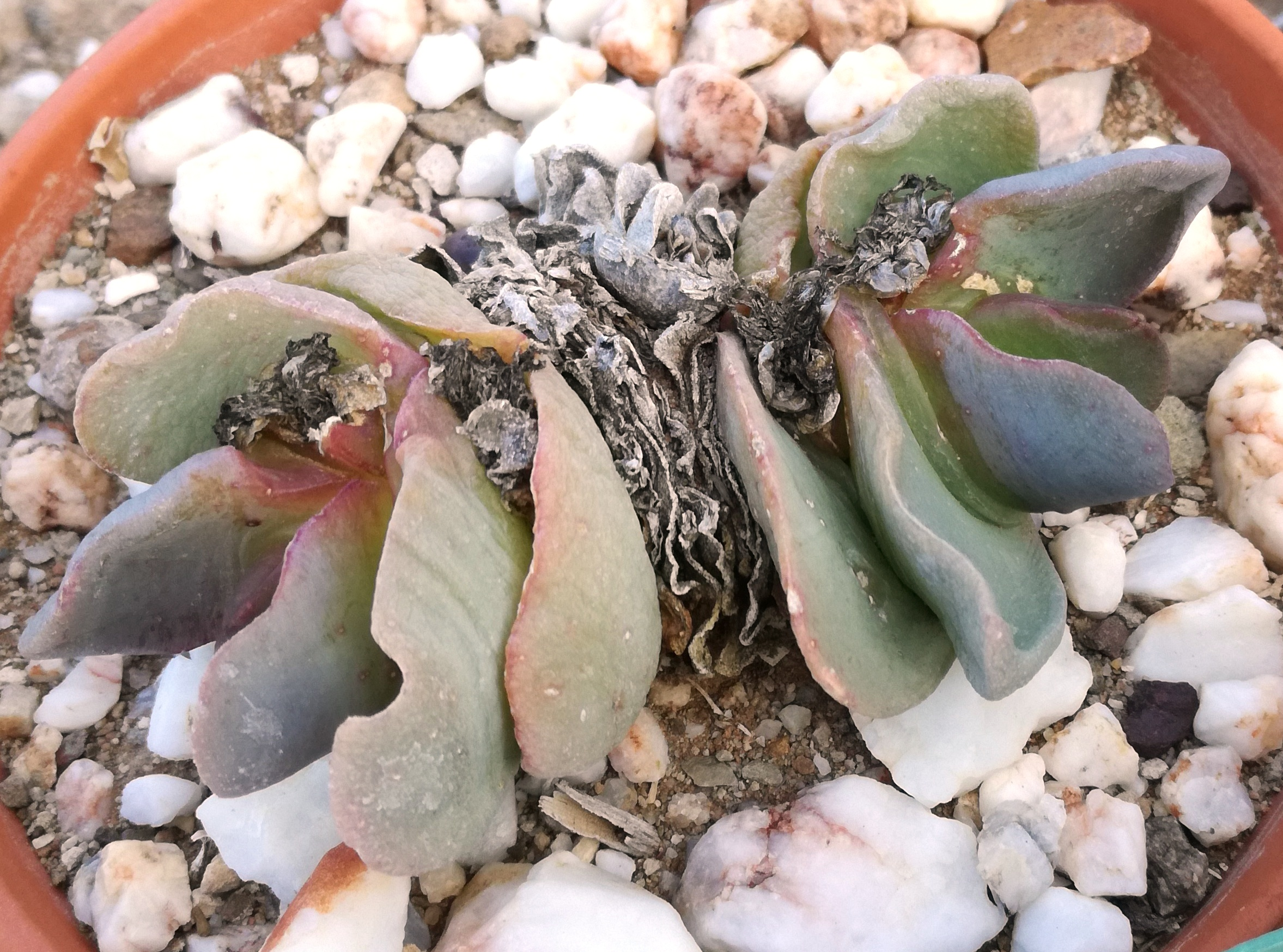
Glottiphyllum carnosum

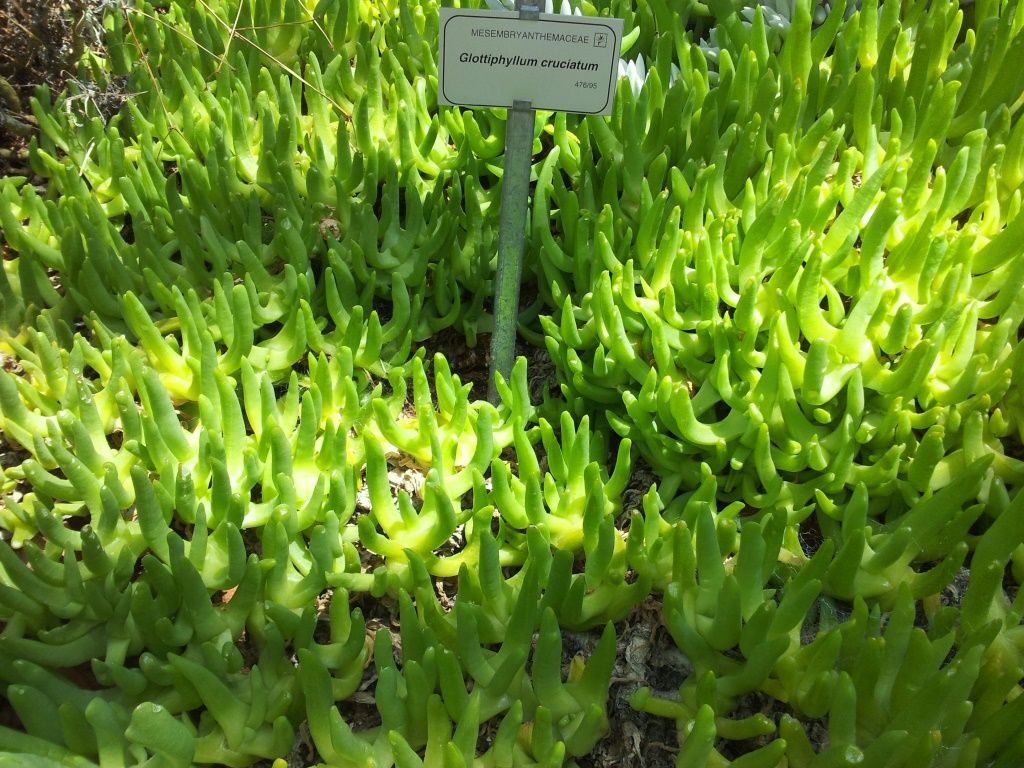
Glottiphyllum cruciatum

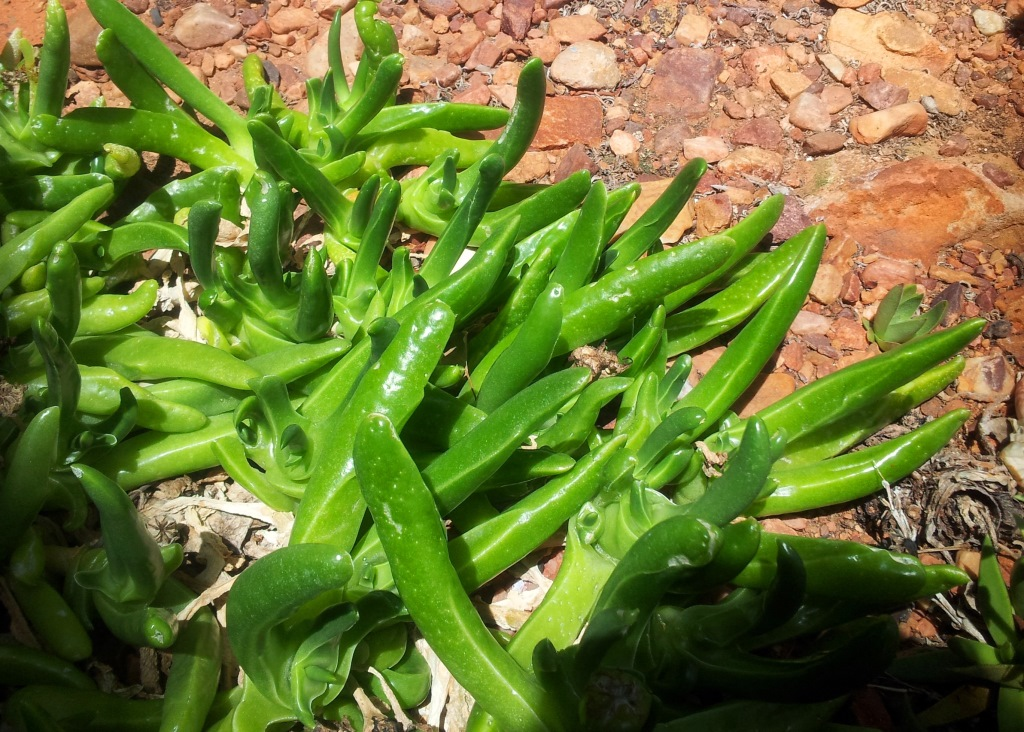
Glottiphyllum difforme

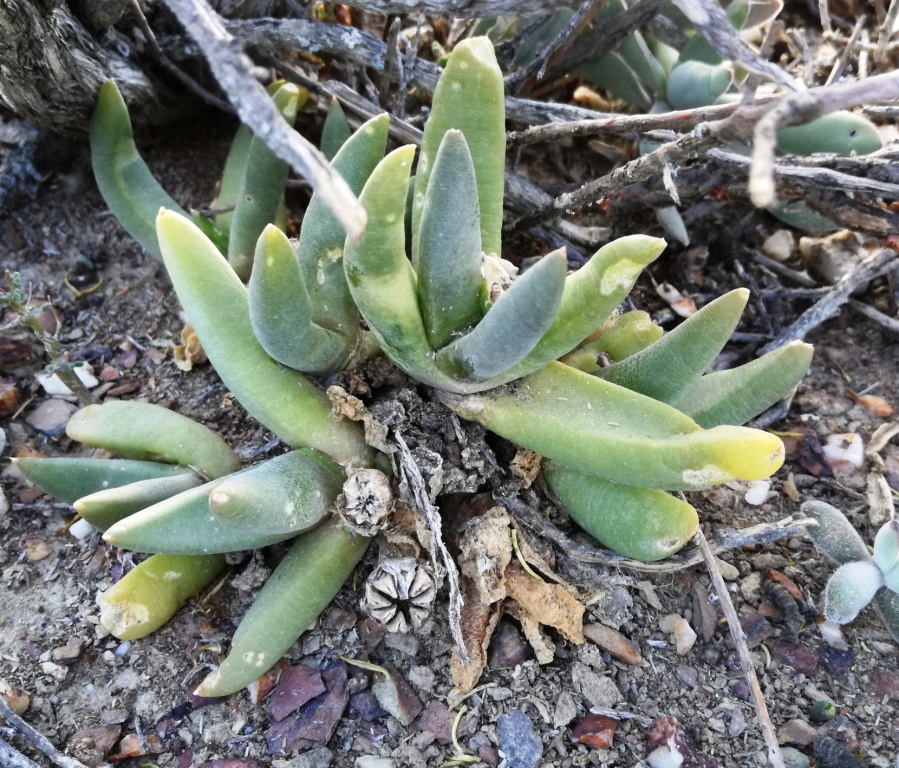
Glottiphyllum fergusoniae

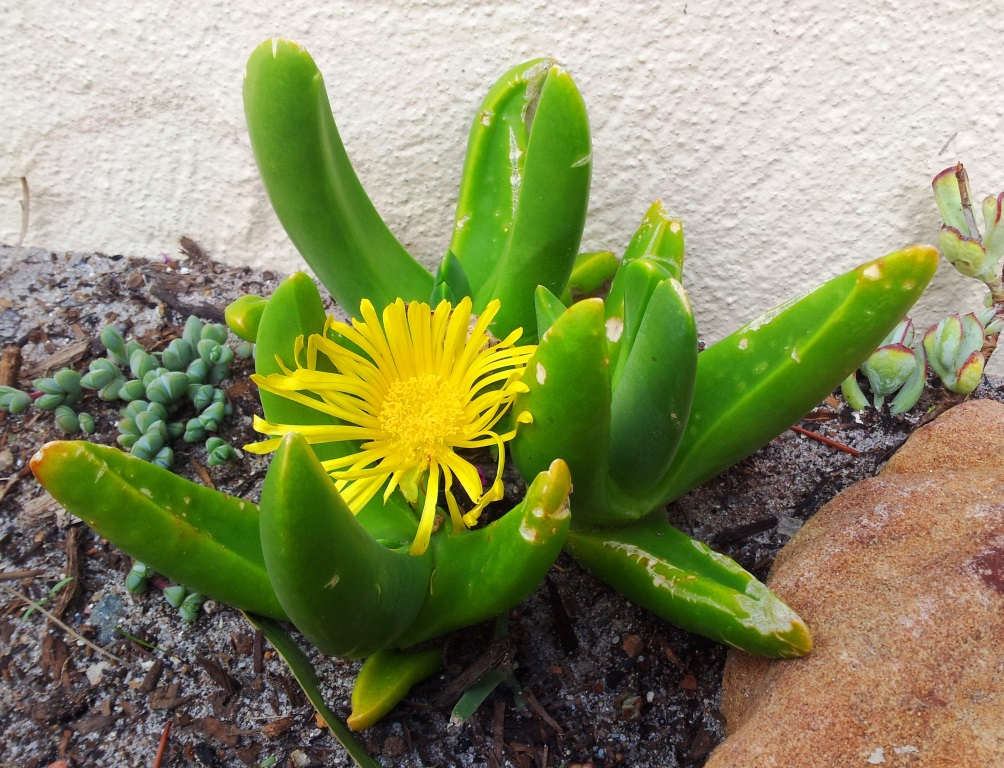
Glottiphyllum regium

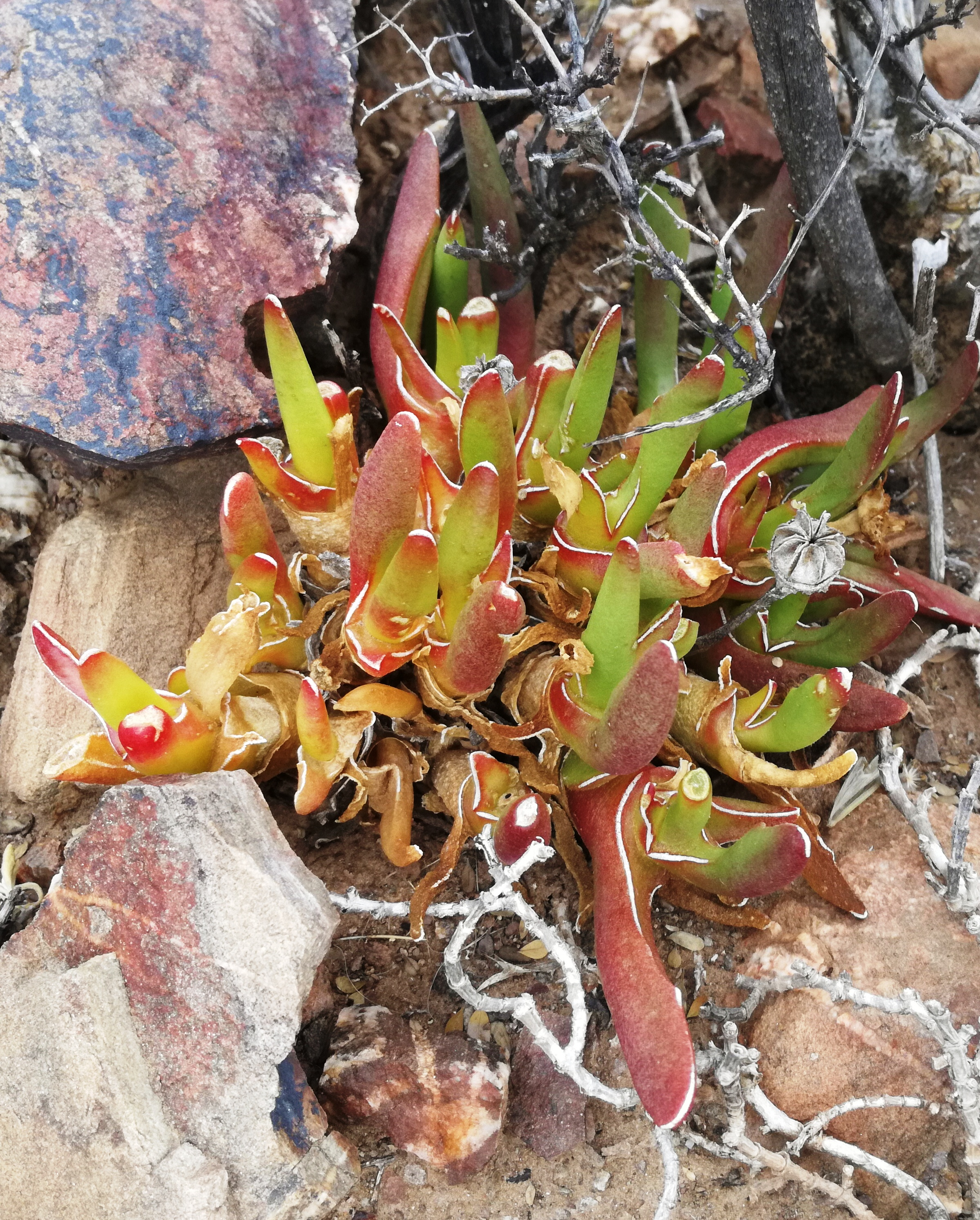
Glottiphyllum peersii

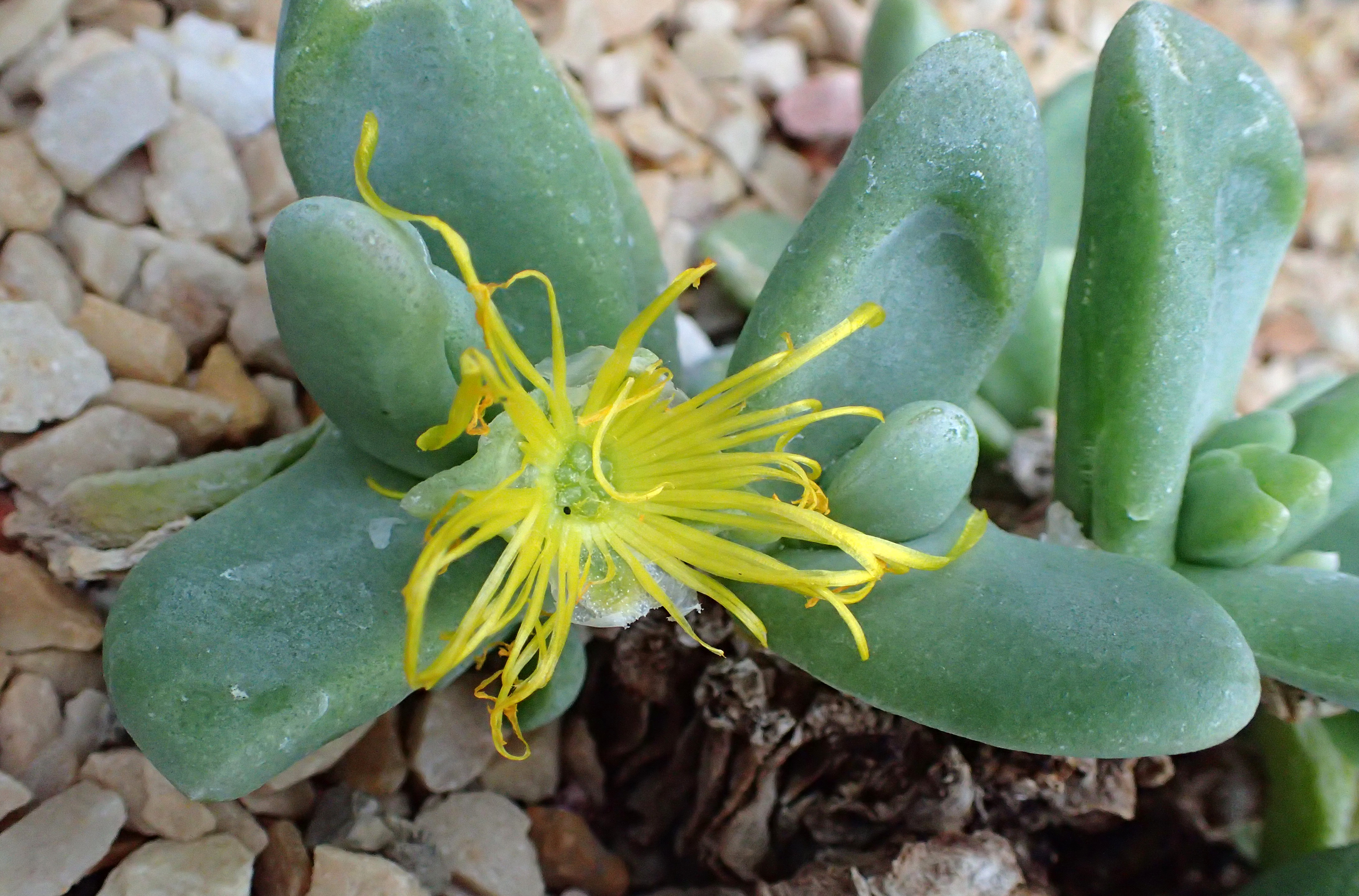
Glottiphyllum oligocarpum

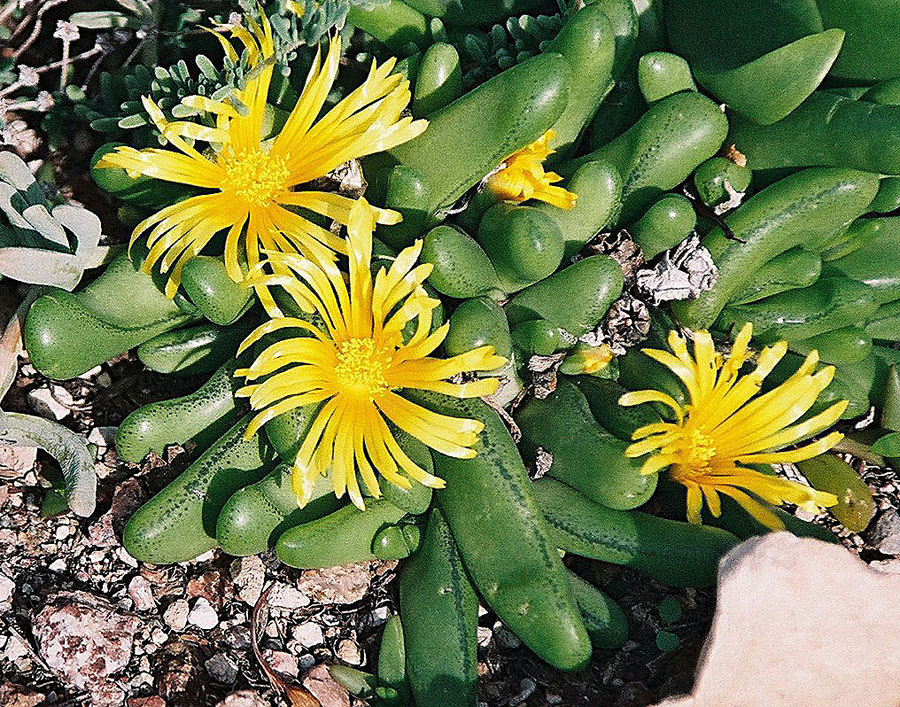
Glottiphyllum nelii

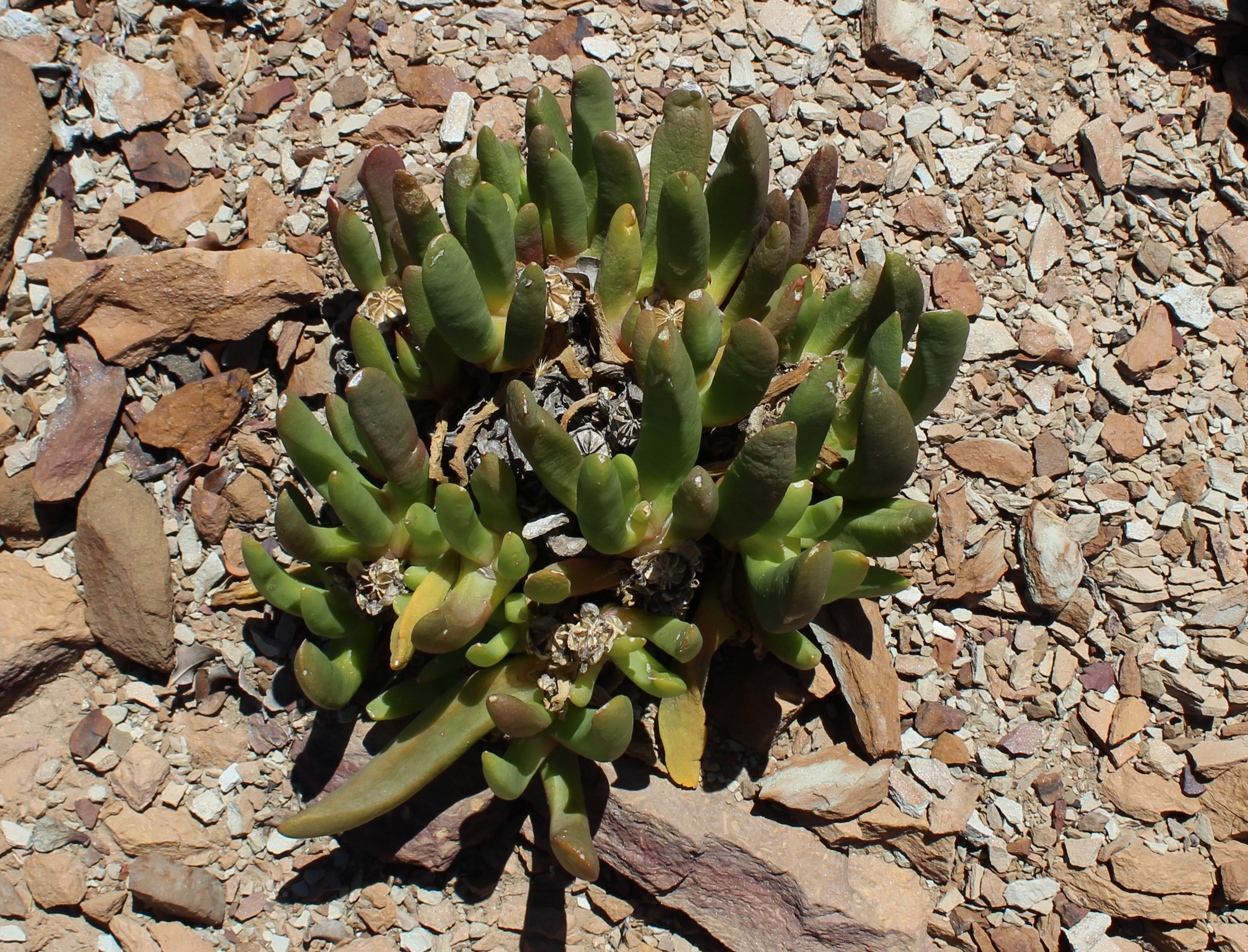
Glottiphyllum surrectum

== Bibliography ==
- Heidrun E. K. Hartmann : Illustrated Handbook of Succulent Plants: Aizoaceae F-Z, Éditions Springer, Berlin/Heidelberg/New York, 2001, ISBN 3-540-41723-0
- Gideon Smith u.a. : Mesembs of the World: Illustrated Guide to a Remarkable Succulent Group, Éditions Springer, 1998, ISBN 1-875093-13-3
- Heidrun E.K. Hartmann, Horst Gölling: A monograph on the genus Glottiphyllum (Mesembryanthema, Aizoaceae). In: Bradleya. Band 11, 1993, S. 1–49
