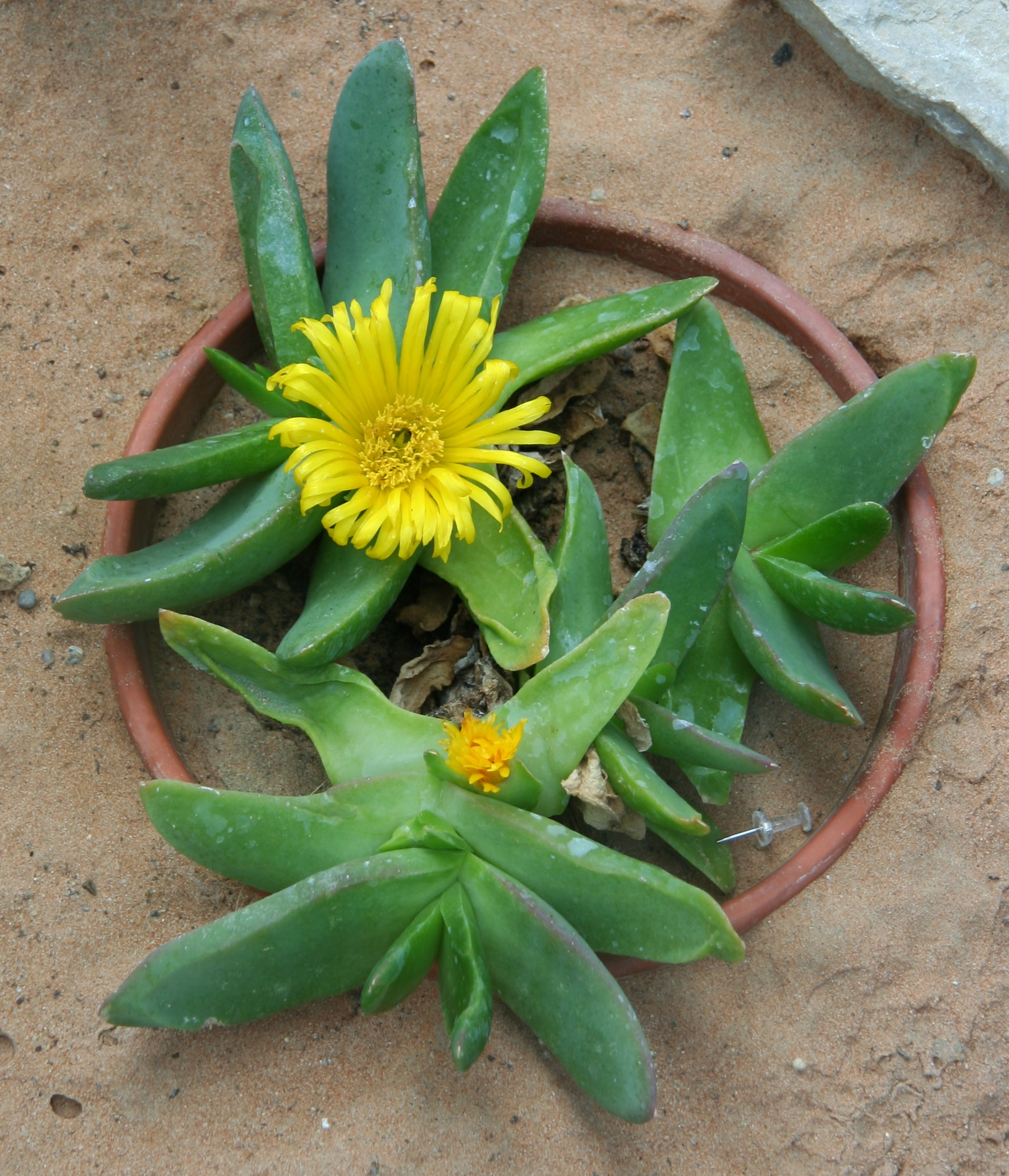

Scientific classification
- Kingdom: Plantae
- Clade: Tracheophytes
- Clade: Angiosperms
- Clade: Eudicots
- Order: Caryophyllales
- Family: Aizoaceae
- Genus: Glottiphyllum
- Species: G. salmii

Binomial name
- Glottiphyllum salmii (Haw.) N.E.Br.

Synonyms
- Mesembryanthemum salmii Haw.

= Glottiphyllum salmii =

Species of succulent

Glottiphyllum salmii is a small succulent plant that is part of the Aizoaceae family. The species is endemic to South Africa and occurs in the Eastern Cape and the Western Cape, between Willowmore and Uniondale. The plant has a range of less than 300 km² and two subpopulations are known. More research needs to be done on the plant. It is currently threatened by overgrazing and trampling by ostriches.
