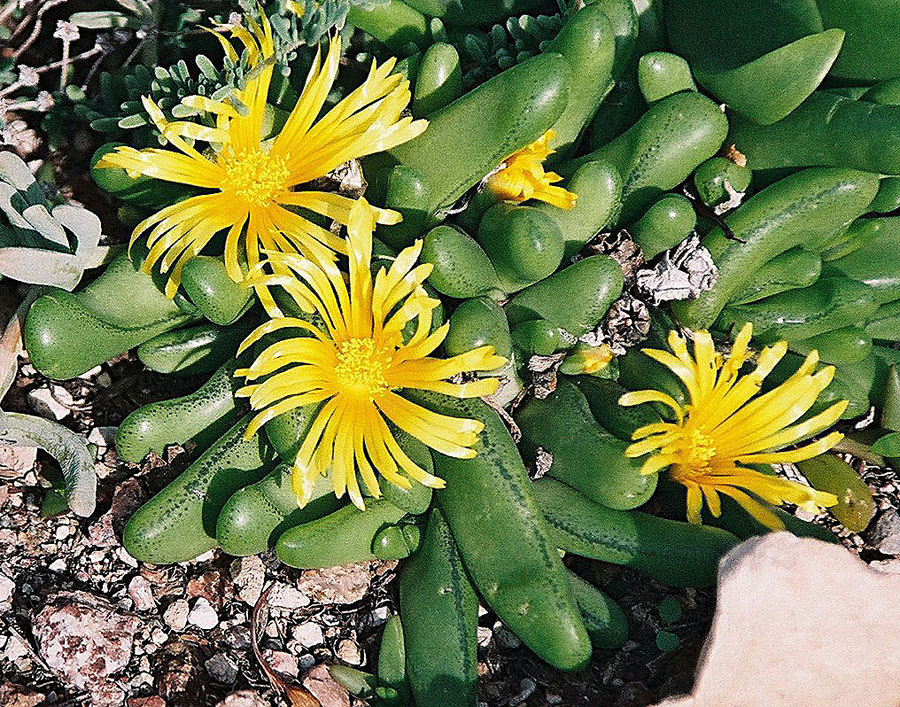
- Glottiphyllum nelii, showing the translucent lines along its leaf margins

Scientific classification
- Kingdom: Plantae
- Clade: Tracheophytes
- Clade: Angiosperms
- Clade: Eudicots
- Order: Caryophyllales
- Family: Aizoaceae
- Genus: Glottiphyllum
- Species: G. nelii

Binomial name
- Glottiphyllum nelii Schwantes

= Glottiphyllum nelii =

Species of succulent

Glottiphyllum nelii is a species of succulent plant, in the family Aizoaceae. It is indigenous to the arid Great Karoo region, South Africa.

== Description ==
The leaves are shiny, green and distichous (produced in two parallel ranks), with smooth, rounded tips.

This species often has lines of translucent cells, along the margins and keel of its leaves. This character can often be used to identify G. nelii.

The seed capsule has 8 or fewer locules, high valves (over 3 mm (0.12 in)), and a thick, angular, conical base. After it has dried, the capsule soon falls off from the plant.

It resembles its closest relative Glottiphyllum oligocarpum, in its general form, but its leaves are glossy and do not have any waxy, white covering.

== Distribution ==
This species occurs in shaley-loamy soils - often in the shelter of bushes - in an east–west belt, north of the Swartberg Mountain range, in the Western Cape and Eastern Cape provinces, South Africa.
