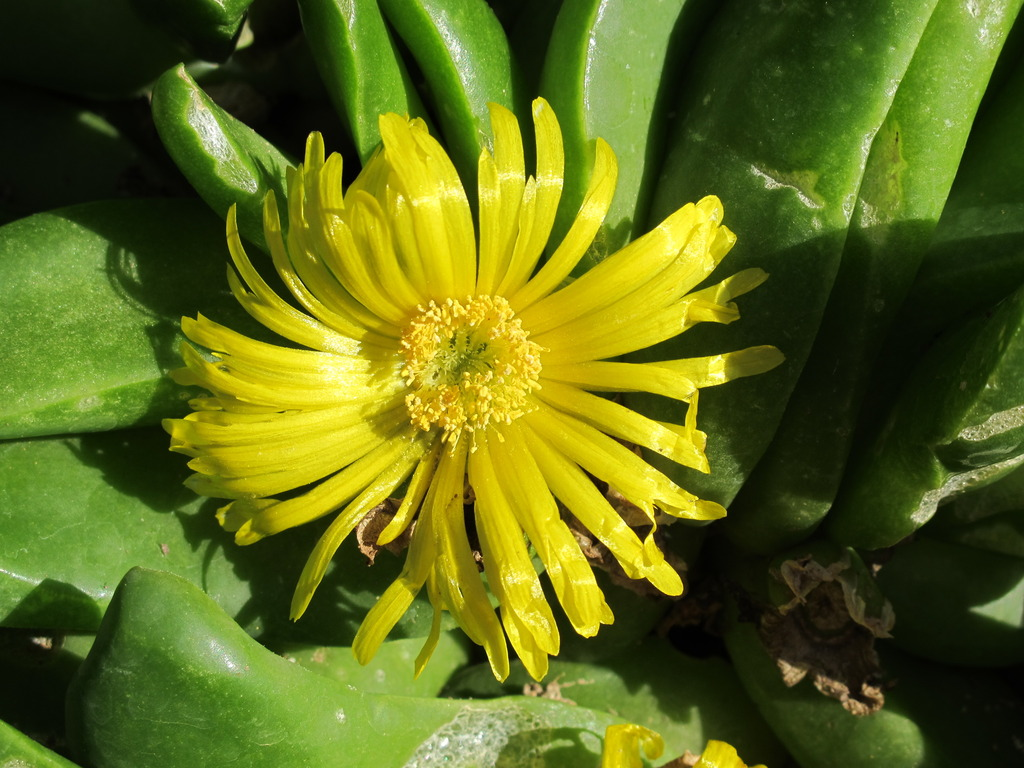

Scientific classification
- Kingdom: Plantae
- Clade: Tracheophytes
- Clade: Angiosperms
- Clade: Eudicots
- Order: Caryophyllales
- Family: Aizoaceae
- Genus: Glottiphyllum
- Species: G. neilii

Binomial name
- Glottiphyllum neilii N.E.Br.

Synonyms
- Mesembryanthemum neilii (N.E.Br.) N.E.Br.

= Glottiphyllum neilii =

Species of succulent

Glottiphyllum neilii is a small succulent plant that is part of the Aizoaceae family. The species is endemic to South Africa and occurs in the Eastern Cape and the Western Cape.
