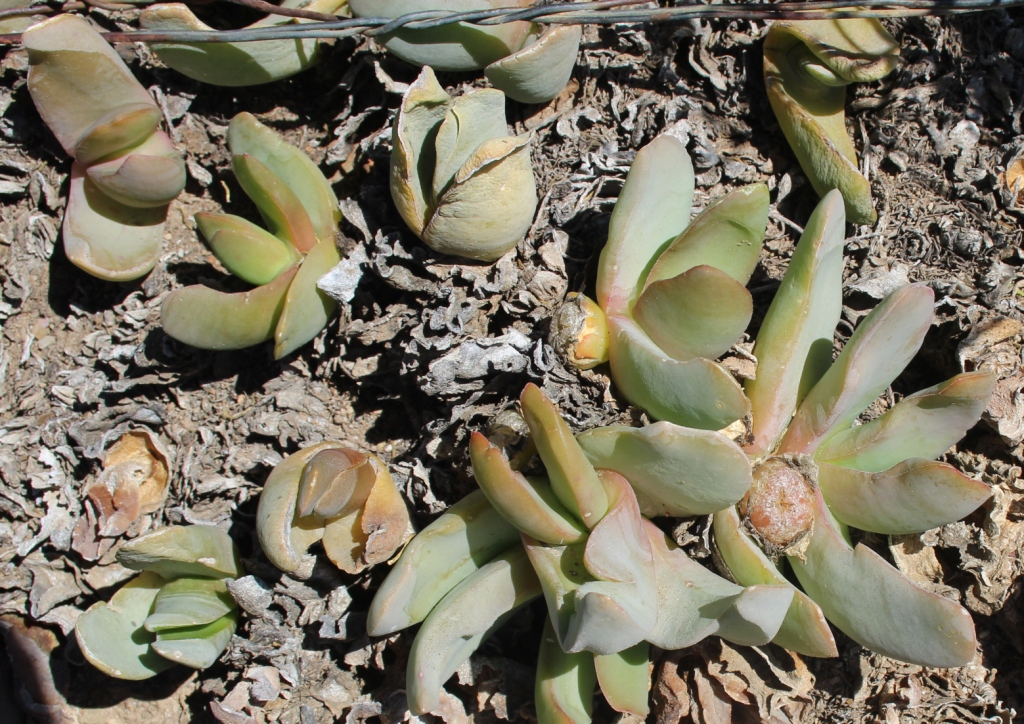
- Glottiphyllum carnosum in habitat near Oudtshoorn

Scientific classification
- Kingdom: Plantae
- Clade: Tracheophytes
- Clade: Angiosperms
- Clade: Eudicots
- Order: Caryophyllales
- Family: Aizoaceae
- Genus: Glottiphyllum
- Species: G. carnosum

Binomial name
- Glottiphyllum carnosum N.E.Br.

= Glottiphyllum carnosum =

Species of succulent

Glottiphyllum carnosum is a rare species of succulent plant, of the family Aizoaceae. It is indigenous to arid areas between the towns of Calitzdorp and Oudtshoorn in the Western Cape, South Africa. It co-occurs with several other species of Glottiphyllum.

== Description ==
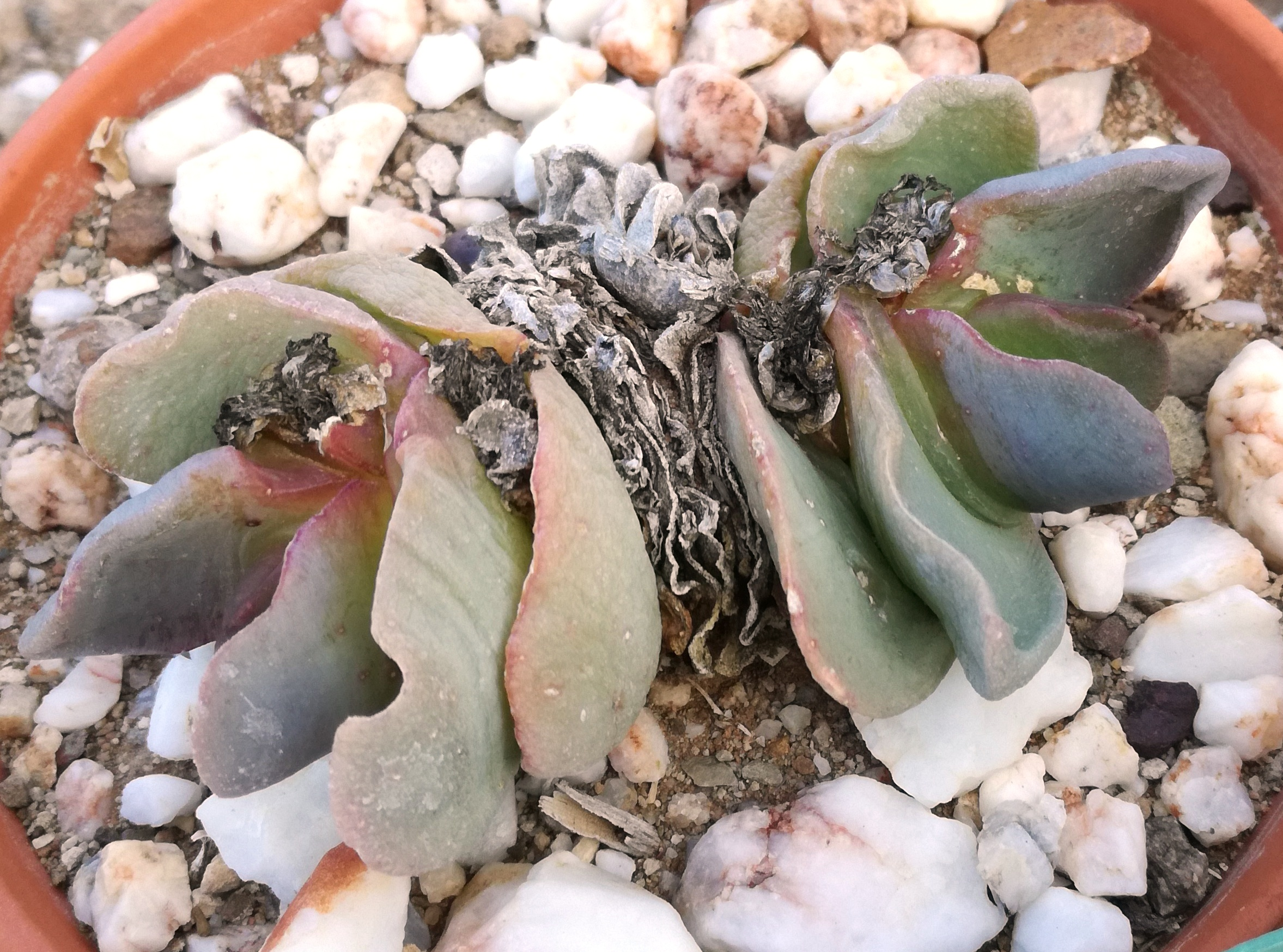
Glottiphyllum carnosum in cultivation

This species has a pale, waxy layer on its leaves, which gives it a greyish colour. It has thickened leaves with edges that are often undulated and hunched at the tip. It also tends to proliferate and eventually form small clumps. Its seed capsules have a woody base, and a rounded domed top.

It resembles Glottiphyllum linguiforme, which looks similar but has flatter leaves. In contrast, G. carnosum has much thicker leaves, with a hunched tip, and it tends of offset and branch far more.
