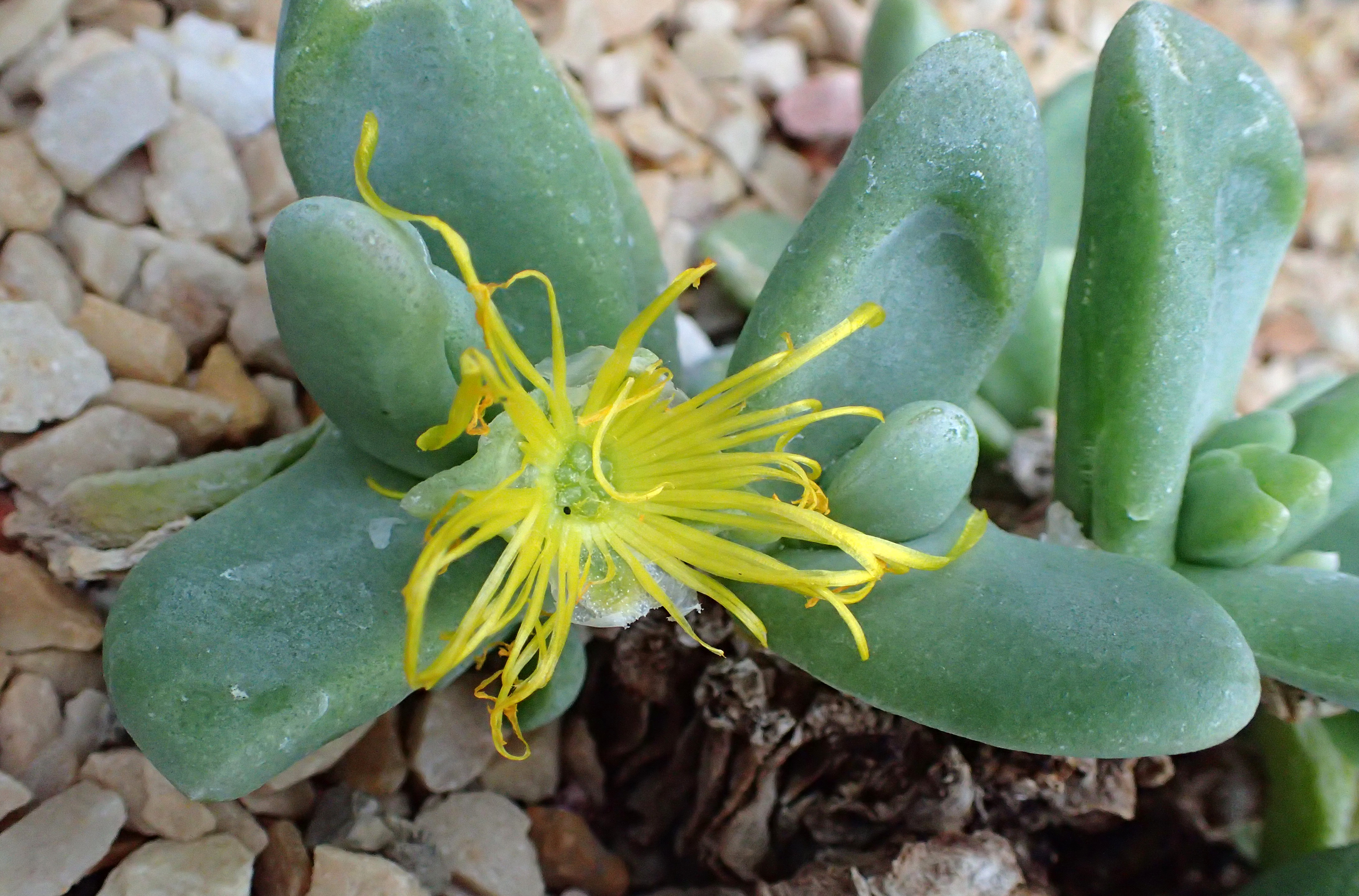

Scientific classification
- Kingdom: Plantae
- Clade: Tracheophytes
- Clade: Angiosperms
- Clade: Eudicots
- Order: Caryophyllales
- Family: Aizoaceae
- Genus: Glottiphyllum
- Species: G. oligocarpum

Binomial name
- Glottiphyllum oligocarpum L.Bolus

= Glottiphyllum oligocarpum =

Species of succulent

Glottiphyllum oligocarpum is a species of succulent plant, in the family Aizoaceae. It is indigenous to arid areas of the Little Karoo, in the Western Cape, South Africa.

== Description ==
It produces its leaves in two ranks (distichous), having many prostrate leaf-pairs per branch. Each leaf is covered with a white, waxy layer, which can be rubbed off. The leaf is thick with smoothly rounded margins. The stems branch until the plant forms a clump

The stalk-less fruits have soft, conical bases, and fall off the plant when they dry, becoming tumble fruits and spreading the seeds. The fruits have high valves and no awns with a maximum of eight locules.

This species resembles its close relative Glottiphyllum nelii which overlaps it in range, but mostly grows to the north in the Great Karoo. However G.nelii has shiny leaves, without any pale, waxy covering, and often has translucent lines along its leaf margins. G.nelii also has fewer branches and fewer leaves per branch.

== Distribution ==
This species occurs in open quartz flats, in the arid north-east of the Little Karoo (the "Steytlerville Karoo") and the south eastern corner of the Great Karoo.
