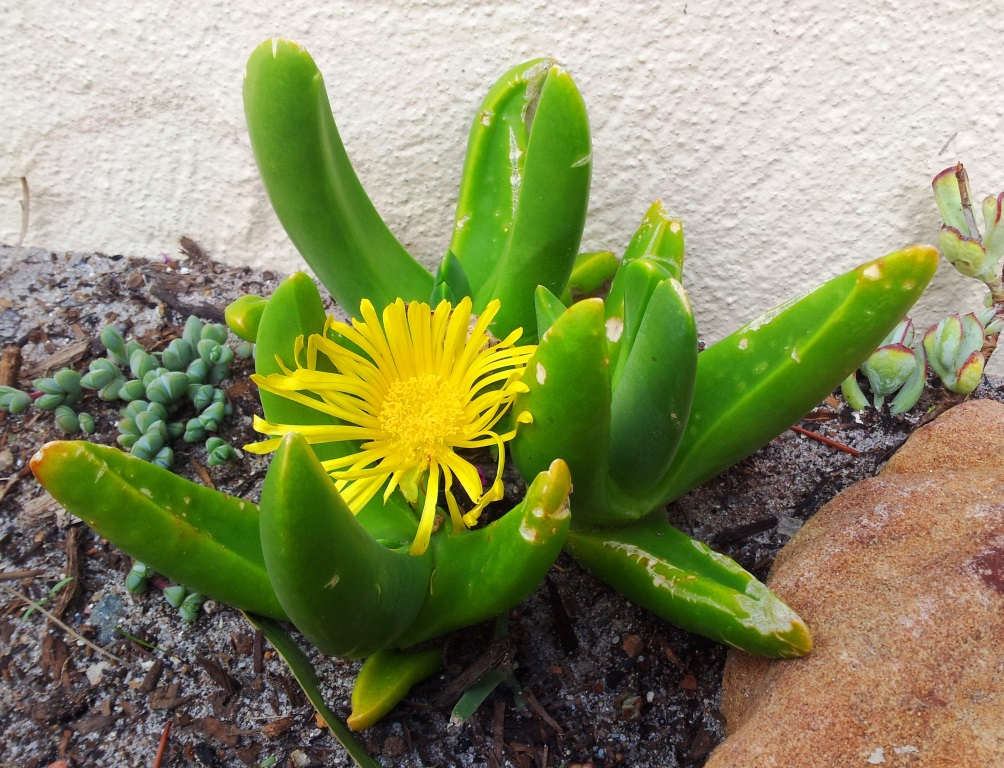

Scientific classification
- Kingdom: Plantae
- Clade: Tracheophytes
- Clade: Angiosperms
- Clade: Eudicots
- Order: Caryophyllales
- Family: Aizoaceae
- Genus: Glottiphyllum
- Species: G. regium

Binomial name
- Glottiphyllum regium N.E.Br.

= Glottiphyllum regium =

Species of succulent

Glottiphyllum regium is a rare species of succulent plant, in the family Aizoaceae. It is known locally as "koeispene" ("cow-nipples" in the Afrikaans language). It is restricted to a small arid area near Calitzdorp in the Western Cape, South Africa.

== Description ==
This is the largest species of its genus, with leaves over 65 mm (2.6 in) in length. The leaves are bright green, upturned, fleshy and are born in pairs. The two leaves in a leaf-pair are a very similar size, unlike many other species of Glottiphyllum. The leaf-pairs grow in a decussate arrangement (each leaf-pair at right angles to the previous one, rather than all in the same two distichous rows). The leaf also does not have a swollen base (unlike Glottiphyllum cruciatum). The seed capsules are soft and spongy, with high rims.
