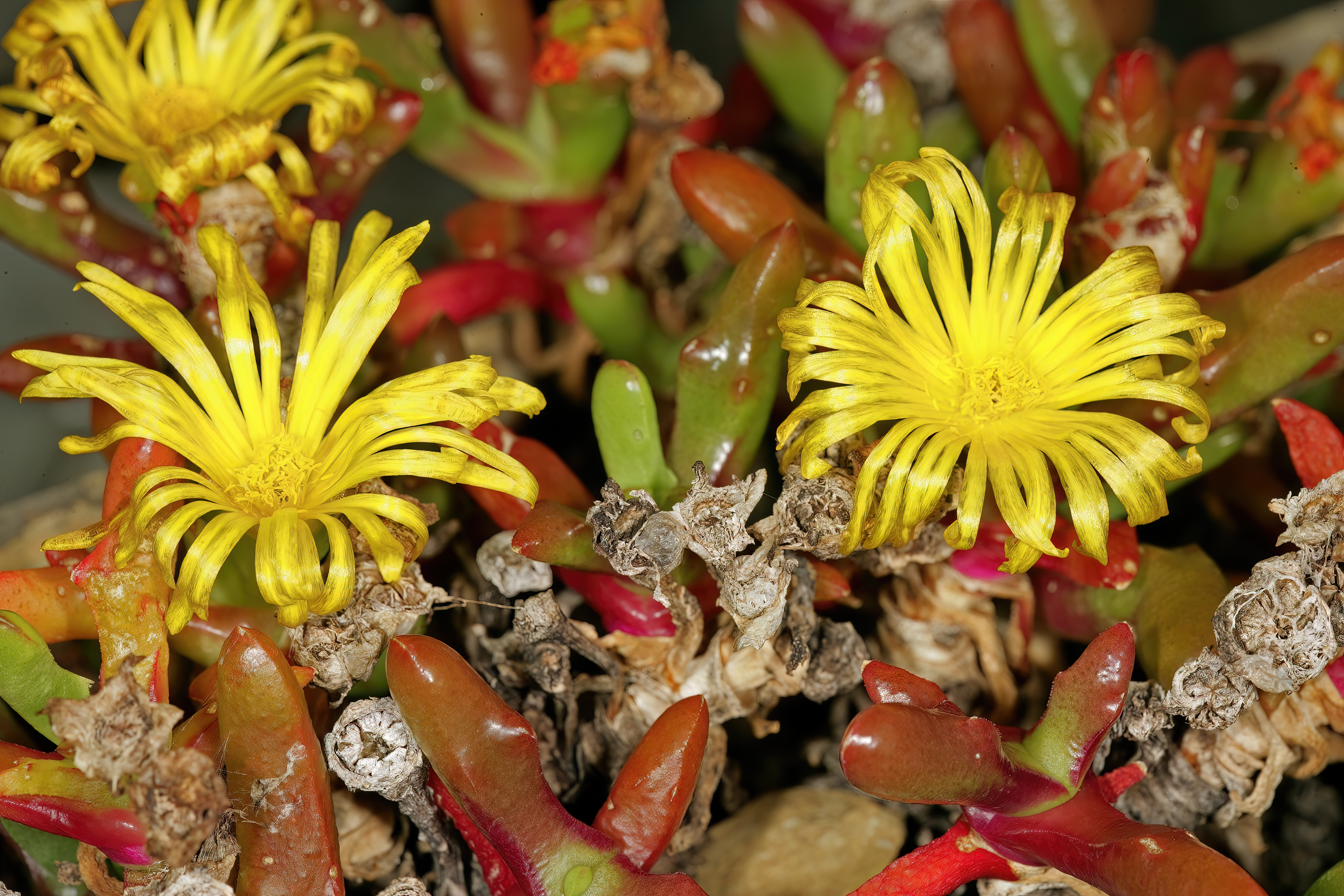

Scientific classification
- Kingdom: Plantae
- Clade: Tracheophytes
- Clade: Angiosperms
- Clade: Eudicots
- Order: Caryophyllales
- Family: Aizoaceae
- Genus: Glottiphyllum
- Species: G. difforme

Binomial name
- Glottiphyllum difforme (L.) N.E.Br.

Synonyms
- Glottiphyllum semicylindricum (Haw.) N.E.Br.; Glottiphyllum subditum N.E.Br.; Mesembryanthemum bidentatum Haw.; Mesembryanthemum bigibberatum Haw.; Mesembryanthemum difforme L.; Mesembryanthemum heterophyllum Haw.; Mesembryanthemum semicylindricum Haw.

= Glottiphyllum difforme =

Species of succulent

Glottiphyllum difforme is a small succulent plant that is part of the Aizoaceae family. The species is endemic to South Africa and occurs in the Eastern Cape and Western Cape. It is found at Steytlerville and in the southeastern Karoo.
