= Glottiphyllum grandiflorum =

Scientific classification
- Kingdom: Plantae
- Clade: Tracheophytes
- Clade: Angiosperms
- Clade: Eudicots
- Order: Caryophyllales
- Family: Aizoaceae
- Genus: Glottiphyllum
- Species: G. grandiflorum

Binomial name
- Glottiphyllum grandiflorum (Haw.) N.E.Br.

Synonyms
- Mesembryanthemum grandiflorum Haw.

Species of succulent

Glottiphyllum grandiflorum is a small succulent plant that is part of the Aizoaceae family. The species is endemic to South Africa and occurs in the Eastern Cape.
