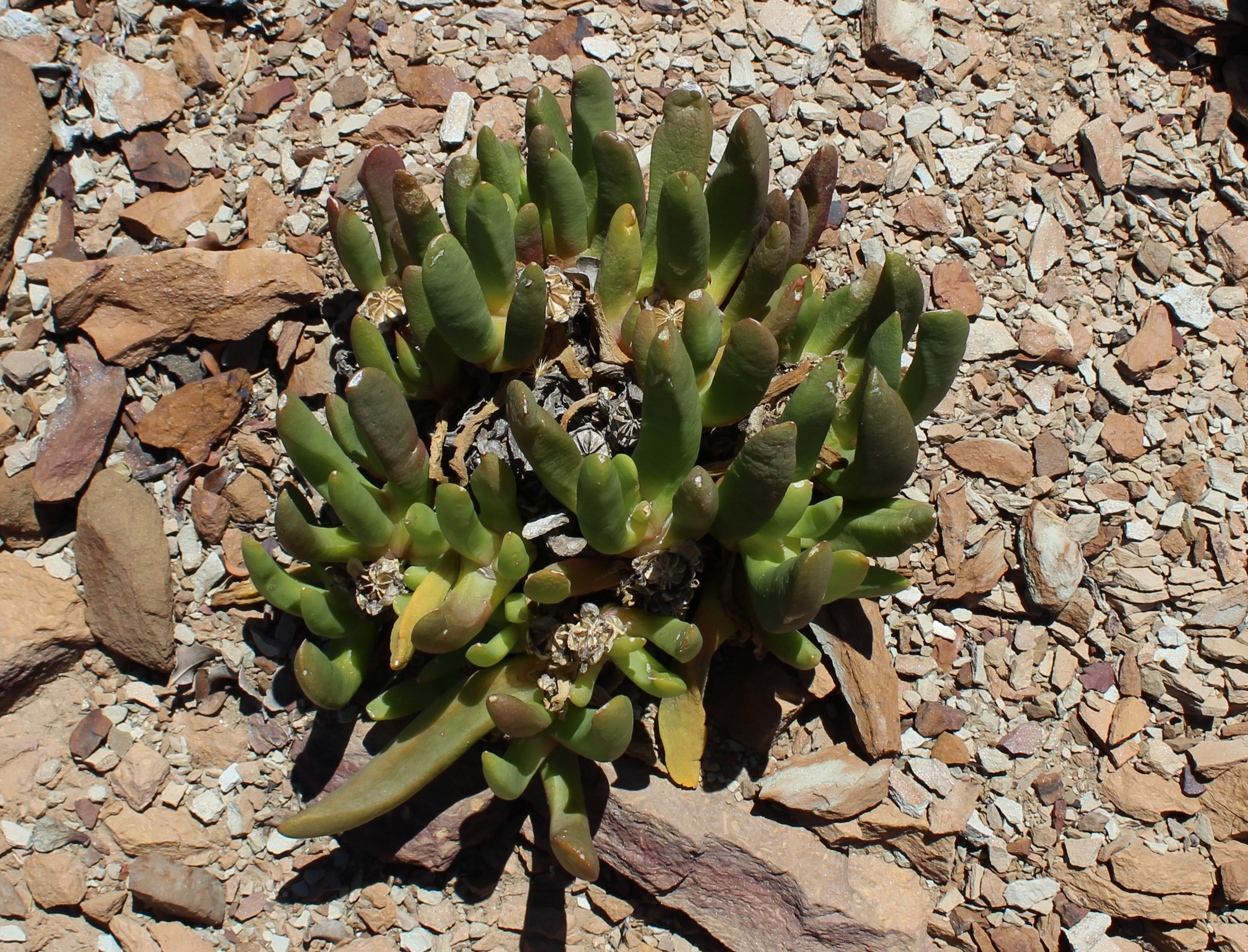

Scientific classification
- Kingdom: Plantae
- Clade: Tracheophytes
- Clade: Angiosperms
- Clade: Eudicots
- Order: Caryophyllales
- Family: Aizoaceae
- Genus: Glottiphyllum
- Species: G. surrectum

Binomial name
- Glottiphyllum surrectum (Haw.) L.Bolus

Synonyms
- Glottiphyllum arrectum N.E.Br. Glottiphyllum concavum N.E.Br. Glottiphyllum parvifolium L.Bolus; Glottiphyllum rubrostigma L.Bolus; Mesembryanthemum subrectum Steud. Mesembryanthemum surrectum Haw.

= Glottiphyllum surrectum =

Species of succulent

Glottiphyllum surrectum is a species of succulent plant, in the family Aizoaceae. It is indigenous to arid areas of the Little Karoo, in the Western Cape, South Africa.

== Description ==
The stems are horizontal but the leaves are slender, erect and rounded in cross-section.

The seed capsule is rounded and raised at the top (valves high and rim low), with a hard, woody (not spongy) base, and no valve wings or awns.

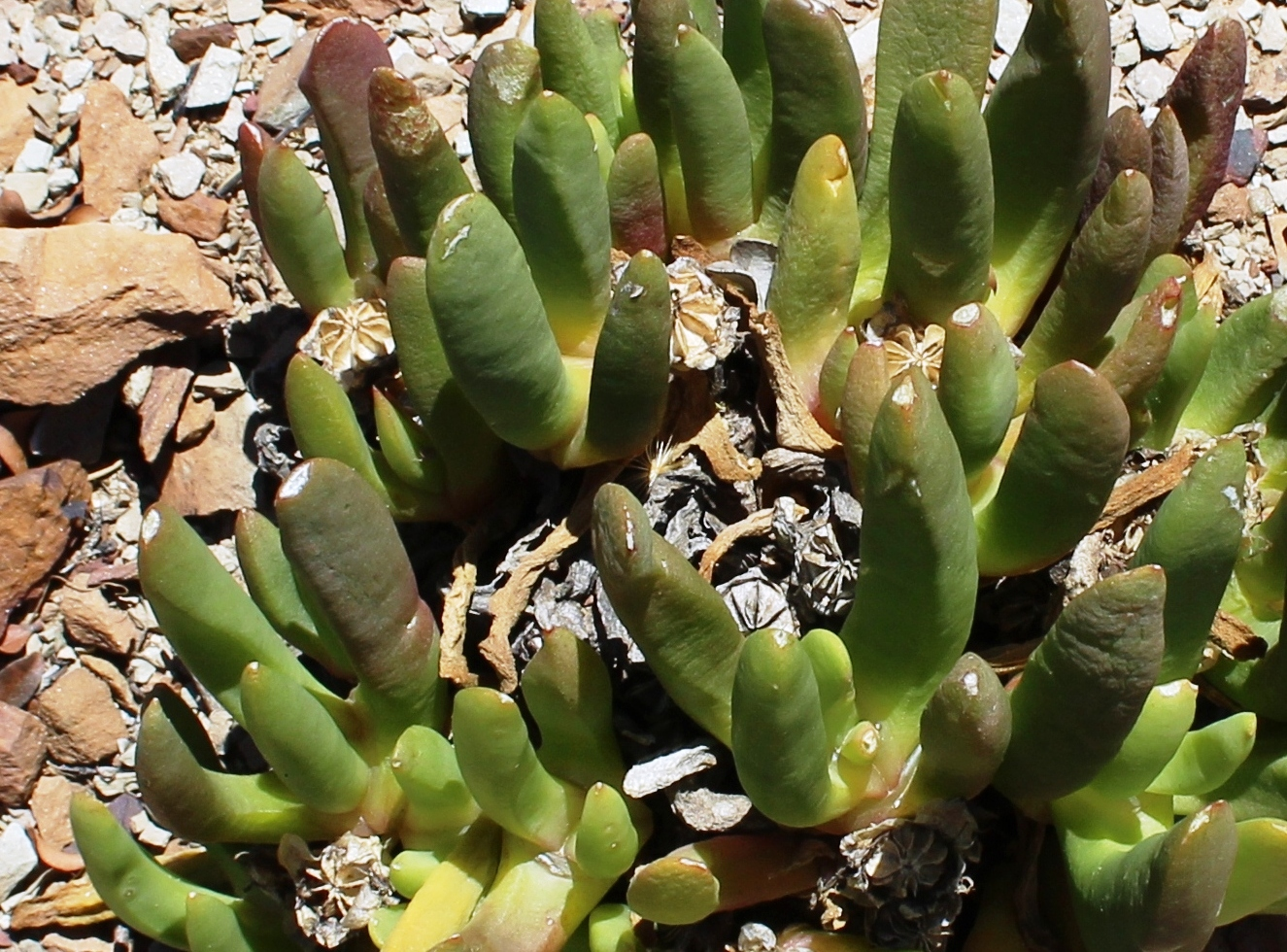
G. surrectum has slender, erect leaves.
