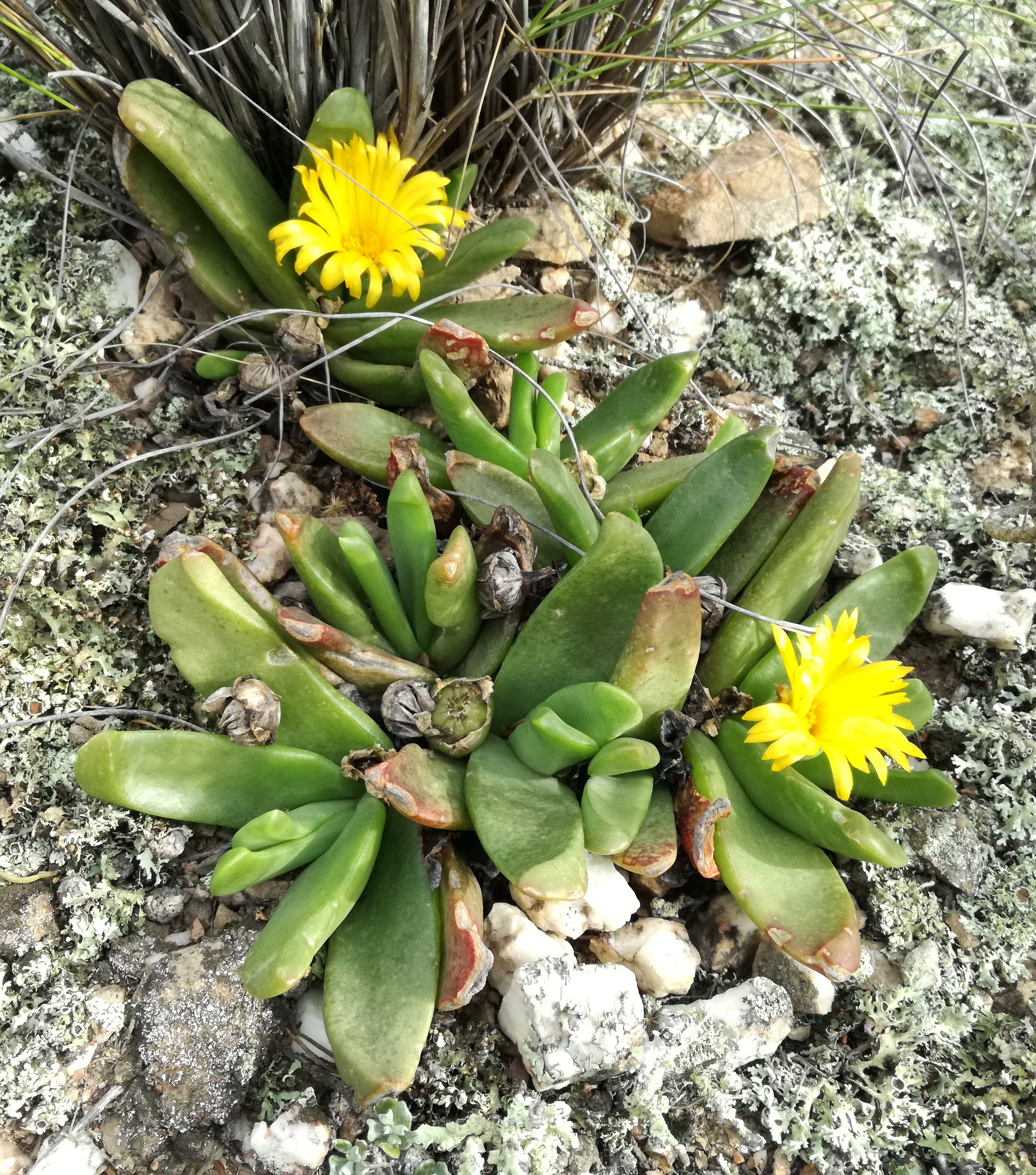
- Glottiphyllum depressum in flower

Scientific classification
- Kingdom: Plantae
- Clade: Tracheophytes
- Clade: Angiosperms
- Clade: Eudicots
- Order: Caryophyllales
- Family: Aizoaceae
- Genus: Glottiphyllum
- Species: G. depressum

Binomial name
- Glottiphyllum depressum (Haw.) N.E.Br.

= Glottiphyllum depressum =

Species of succulent

Glottiphyllum depressum is a common species of succulent plant, of the family Aizoaceae, native to South Africa.

It is probably the most widespread species of Glottiphyllum, after Glottiphyllum longum, and one of the most commonly found in cultivation. Though not as common as G.longum, it is far more variable in its form.

== Description ==
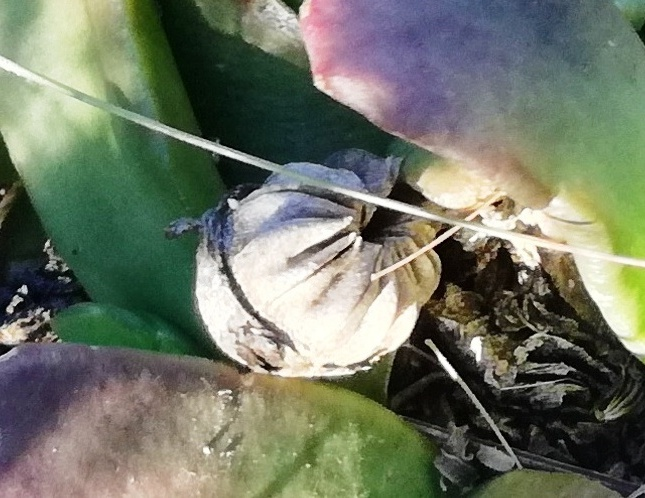
Closed G.depressum seed-capsule. The valves form a high, raised dome. The capsule's rim is low and depressed.

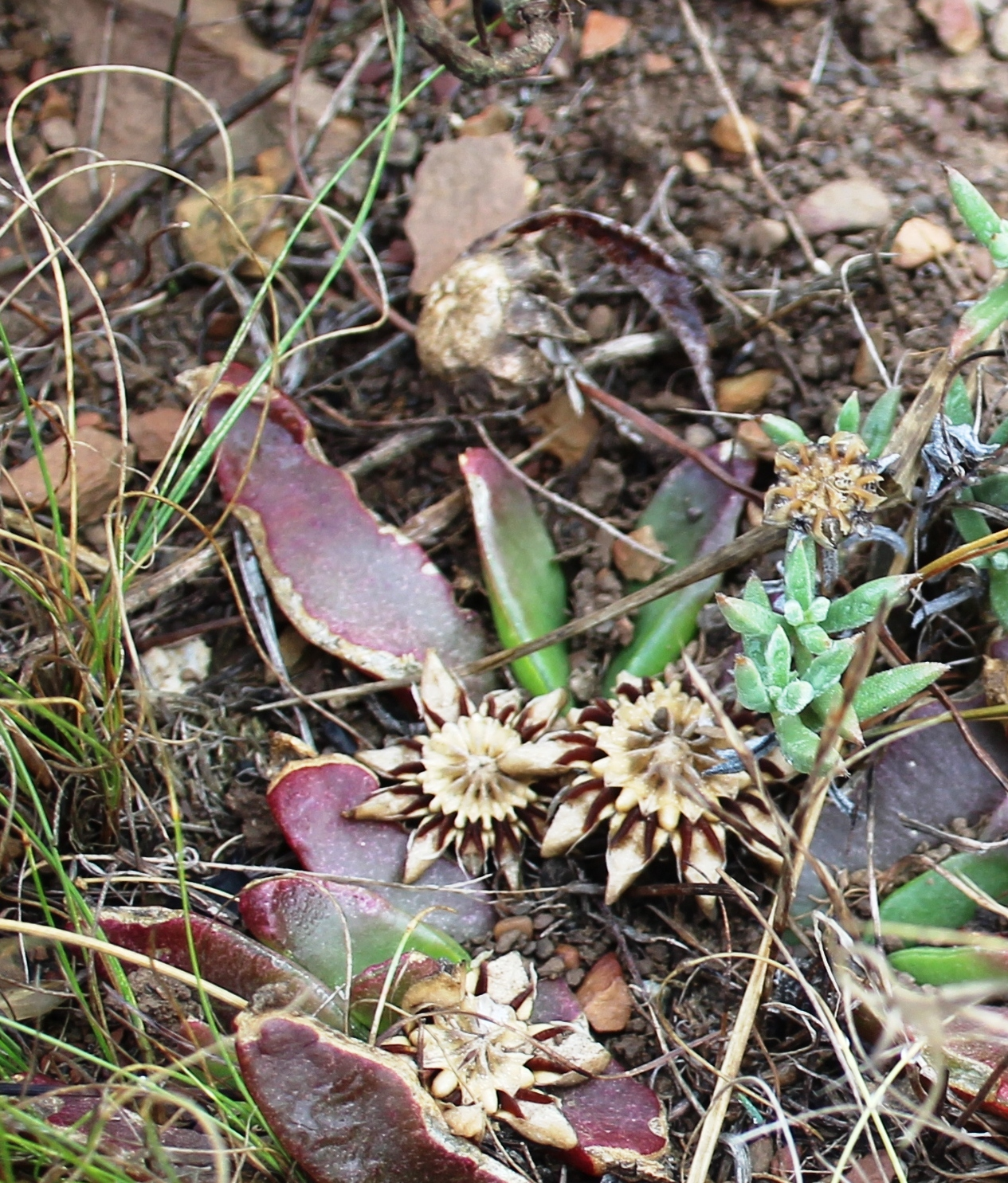
G.depressum seed-capsules opened from rain. The capsules do not have stalks so they are held close to the plant, and soon fall off.

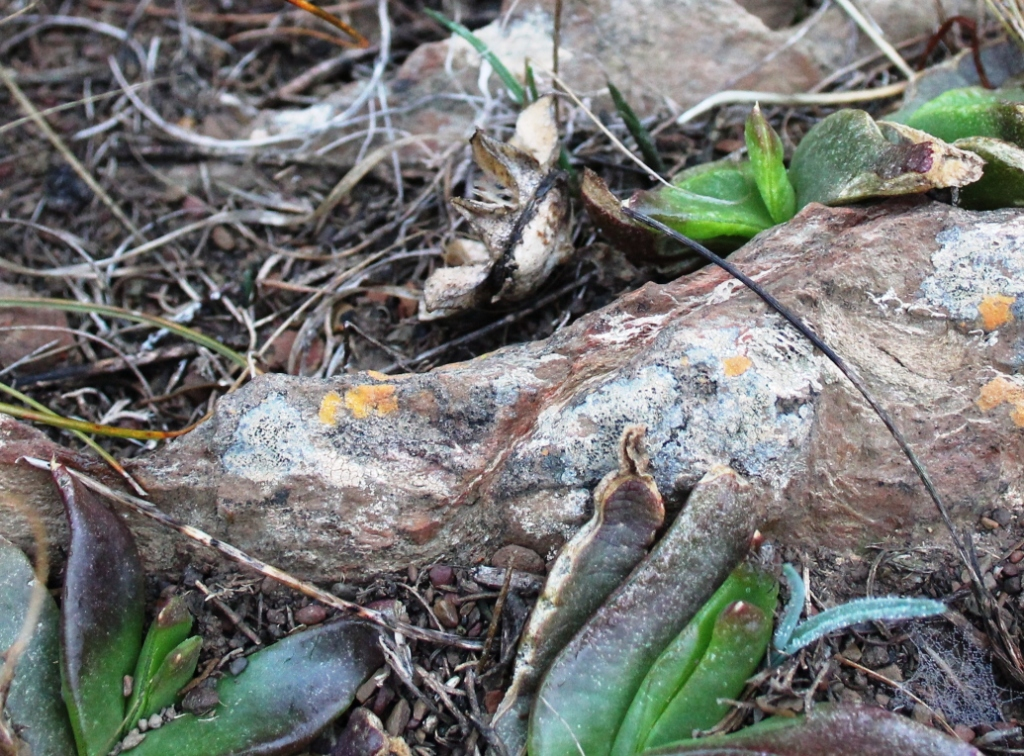
Discarded seed-capsule. After they fall, the rounded capsules roll and spread seed further (tumble-fruits).

It can be distinguished from its relatives by its leaves, many of which are apically hooked. The clear appearance of a hook at the leaf tip is due to the impression of the opposite leaf against it when the leaf-pair was first emerging. The walls of the leaves' bladder cells are also noticeably undulate.

The flowers and fruits do not have long stalks, and are therefore held close against the plant.

The seed capsule has a very soft, round, spongy base, and thick valves raised up in a high (>3 mm) rounded dome shape at the top. The capsule's surrounding rim is low and depressed. The stalks of the capsule disintegrate rapidly, allowing the capsule itself to fall. The rounded capsule then rolls and spreads the seed further (tumble fruit).

Like many Glottiphyllum species, its stems grow horizontally along the ground, with its green, fleshy leaves growing in two opposite rows (distichous).

=== Regional variation ===
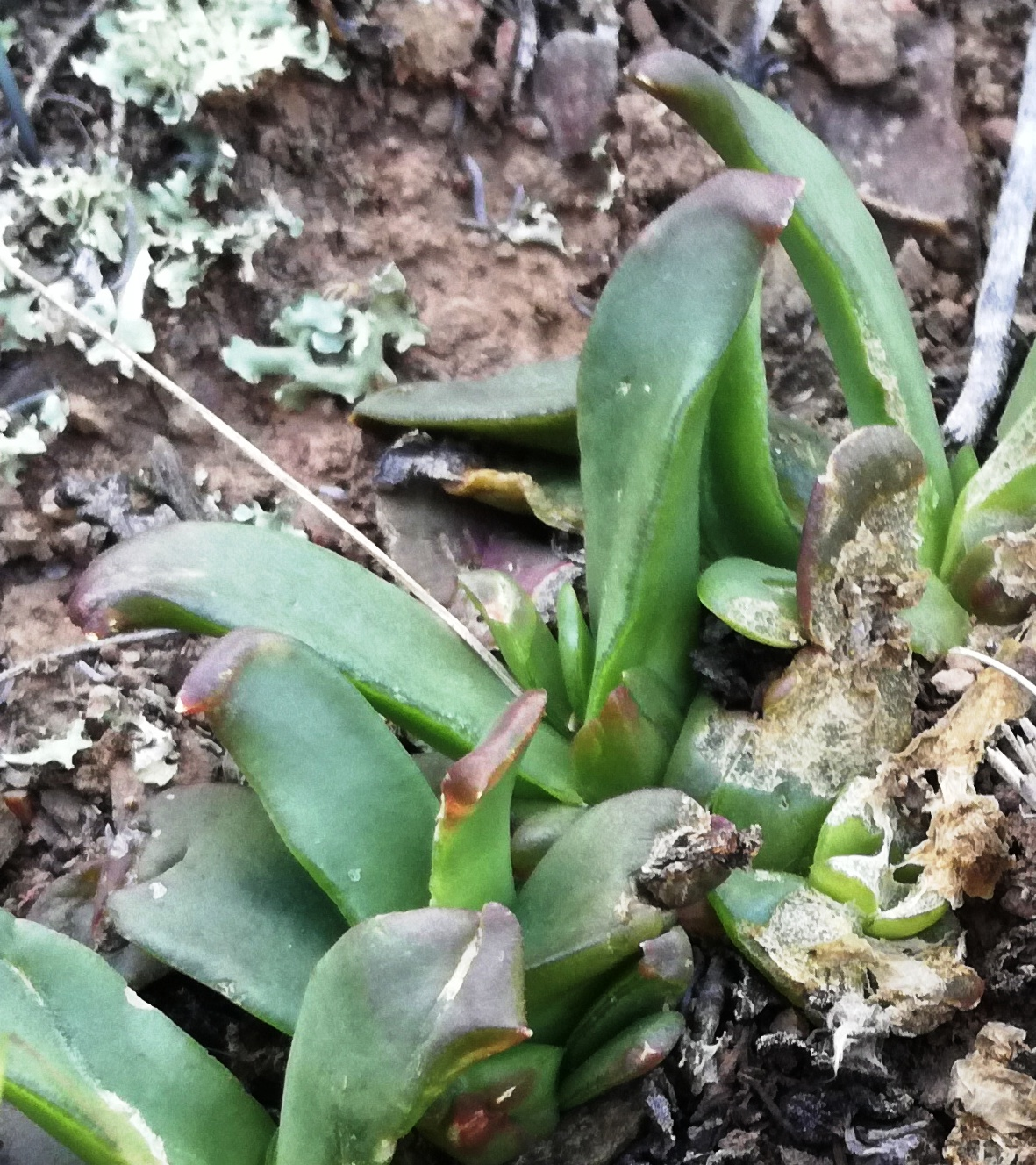
G.depressum can be identified by the "hooked" leaf-tips that many of their leaves have.

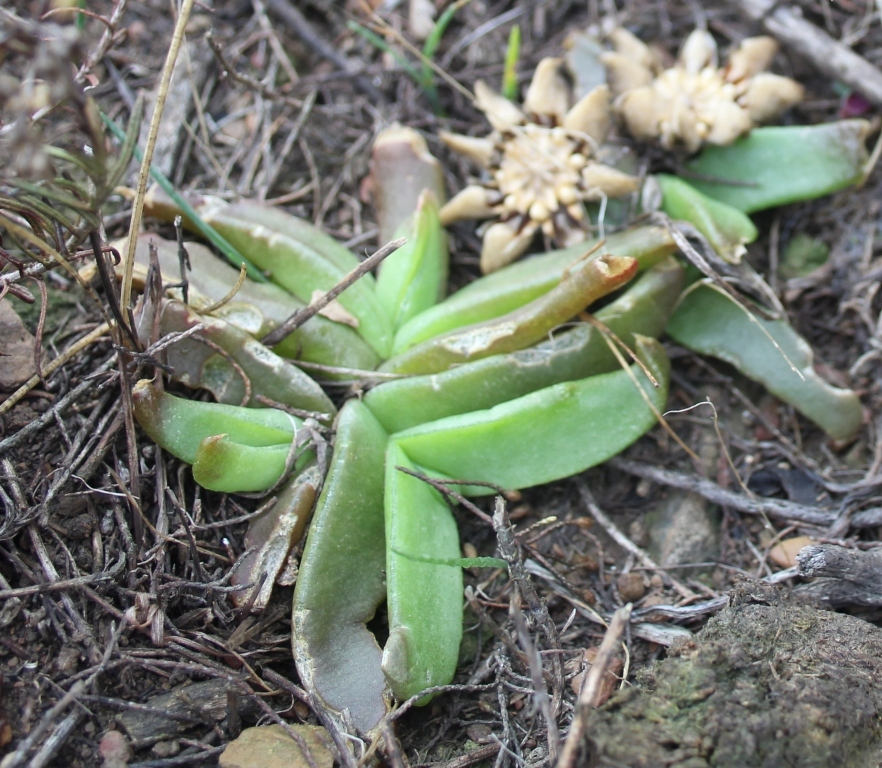
G.depressum leaf detail

This species is extremely variable, and while some varieties of G.depressum have leaves that lie decumbent along the ground, others have ascending leaves that do not have very clear hooks at their tips. Some varieties have flat, strap-shaped leaves, which sometimes even resemble those of Glottiphyllum longum. However their leaves narrow slightly towards the leaf apex. Other varieties have leaves that are laterally compressed and triangular in cross-section. If they are also upright or ascending in their angle, they can sometimes resemble the leaves of Glottiphyllum suave.

However all varieties have some of their leaves with twisted and hooked tips.

=== Distinction from G. longum ===
This species is sometimes confused with the even more widespread Glottiphyllum longum. However G.depressum has clear hooked tips on its leaves, which are also sometimes slightly more erect. The cell walls of its leaves' bladders cells are undulated. The flowers and fruits of G.depressum do not have long stalks so they are held close against the centre of the plant. Its seed capsule also has a very soft, spongy base, and falls away soon. The top of the seed capsule has very thick, raised valves in a tall dome, which is surrounded by a low inconspicuous rim.

G. longum has long, flat, strap-shaped leaves that often lie slightly more prostrate on the ground. They are, at most, only slightly curved at the tip, not strongly hooked. The bladder cells at the rounded leaf-margins are oriented horizontally and not elongated. G. longum fruits are born on long stalks. The seed capsules are flatter on the top, with lower valves and a higher rim, and 9 or more locules. The capsules are also long-lasting, and can be seen persisting on the stem for many years.

== Distribution ==
Widespread in the Western Cape Province, South Africa. It occurs from the Ceres Karoo, across the Overberg region, and eastwards.
