= Regiment Langenhoven =

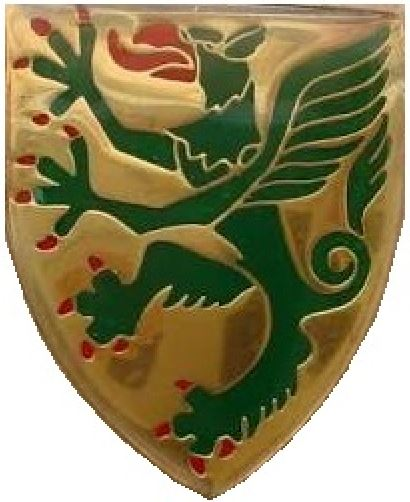
- Regiment Langenhoven emblem
- Active: 1934
- Country: South Africa
- Allegiance: Republic of South Africa
- Branch: South African Army
- Type: Infantry
- Role: Light Infantry
- Size: One Battalion
- Part of: South African Infantry Corps; Army Territorial Reserve
- Garrison/HQ: Oudtshoorn
- Motto: "Slaggereed" (Ready)

Regiment Langenhoven was a motorised infantry regiment of the South African Army. It formed part of the South African Army Infantry Formation. As a reserve unit, it had a status roughly equivalent to that of a present-day British Army Reserve or United States Army National Guard unit.

== History ==
=== Origin ===
Regiment South Western Districts was formed in 1934 and headquartered in Oudtshoorn. The regiment was initially tasked as a machine gun battalion. (This is represented in their cap badge, which shows two machine guns crossed behind a protea.) The regiment drew its members from the towns of Oudsthoorn, George, Mossel Bay, Riversdale, Swellendam, and Robertson.

=== World War Two ===
The regiment was not at full strength at the beginning of the Second World War, and subsequently the regiment was amalgamated with 11th and 12th Armoured Car Companies, forming the 5th Armoured Car Regiment. 5th Armoured Car Regiment then deployed to North Africa on 10 September 1941 arriving at Port Tewfik in Egypt. The regiment did not play a further role in the fighting directly, as its personnel was allocated as reinforcement to depleted units from the fighting at Sid Rezegh. The regiment did, however, volunteer for service with the 6th South African Armoured Division in Italy.

=== Re-mustering and name changes ===
The regiment converted to a motorised infantry battalion in October 1956 and underwent a name change to Regiment Langenhoven after Cornelis Jacobus Langenhoven, a South African poet. Between 1960 and 1966 the regiment was renamed, known as Regiment Outeniqua from 1 January 1960; this was short-lived, and by 1 September 1966 the regiment reverted to the name of Regiment Langenhoven.

=== Disbandment ===
The regiment appears to have been disbanded in 1997.

== Unit insignia ==
=== SADF-era insignia ===
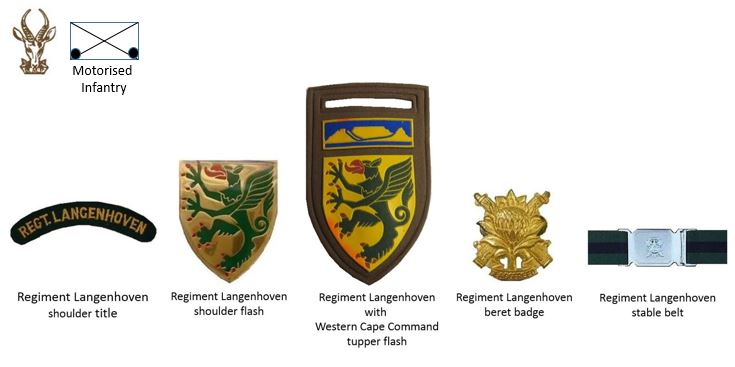
SADF era Regiment Langenhoven insignia
