= Marthinus Lourens de Villiers =

South African composer and clergyman (1885–1977)

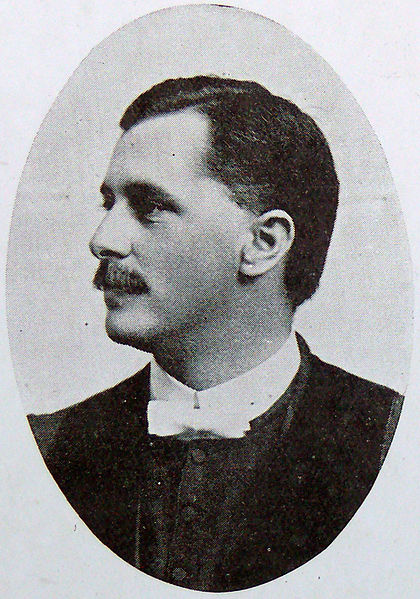
- de Villiers in 1917
- Born: Marthinus Lourens de Villiers
- Died: 17 May 1977; Wellington, Cape Province
- Occupation: composer
- Writing career
- Language: English
- Years active: 1912–1930
- Notable work: "Die Stem van Suid-Afrika"

Marthinus Lourens de Villiers was a minister in the Dutch Reformed Church from 1912 to 1930, then a full-time musician until his death in 1977 and is especially known for his setting of Die Stem.

== Biography ==
The son of Dirk de Villiers, organist of the Dutch Reformed Church, and Tina Smith, he was introduced to the piano, organ and violin at a very young age by his parents, owners of a music institute in Wellington. He later took up the clarinet and played in the Wellington brass band.

He obtained his baccalaureate in 1904, a year after publishing his first piano composition.

From 1905 to 1907, de Villiers taught music in Wepener in the Orange Free State. There he founded a brass band, composed and was organist of the Dutch Reformed Church. He then studied from 1908 to 1911 at the theological seminary in Stellenbosch, during which time he became interested and involved in the defense of the Afrikaans language against English. Of British but also Boer descent, he was also affected by the destruction of the Second Boer War, by the efforts to rebuild the population, by his friendships, notably with the former president Marthinus Steyn. He gradually became a pro-Afrikaner activist.

From 1912 to 1918 he was reverend of the Dutch Reformed Church in Glen Lynden (Bedford) congregation.

From 1919 to 1921, while stationed at the Simonstown Reformed Church, he attended classes in rhythm and harmony with Professor Henry Bell of the South African College of Music.

In 1921, de Villiers composed the music for a poem by Cornelis Jacobus Langenhoven entitled Die Stem van Suid-Afrika, which in 1928 became the official anthem of the Union of South Africa, alongside God Save the King, and then its only national anthem from 1957 to 1994. Many other of his compositions were published in the 1920s.

de Villiers settled in Wellington in the 1930s. He gave up his ministerial duties within the church and until 1945 gave numerous recitals, concerts and lectures at music schools across the country.

Rewarded and celebrated for the rest of his life, he died on May 17, 1977 in Wellington at the age of 91.

== Sources ==
- Feneysey, ds. S.F. 1930. Die Nederduits-Gereformeerde Gemeente Glen Lynden Gedurende 'n Honderd Jare 1829–1929. Kaapstad, Stellenbosch en Bloemfontein: Nasionale Pers, Beperk.
- Malan, Jacques P. 1980. Suid-Afrikaanse Musiekensiklopedie Deel I A-D. Kaapstad: Oxford University Press.
- Swart, dr. M.J. (voorsitter redaksiekomitee). 1980. Afrikaanse kultuuralmanak. Aucklandpark: Federasie van Afrikaanse Kultuurvereniginge.
- Wêreldspektrum, 1982, ISBN 0908409451
