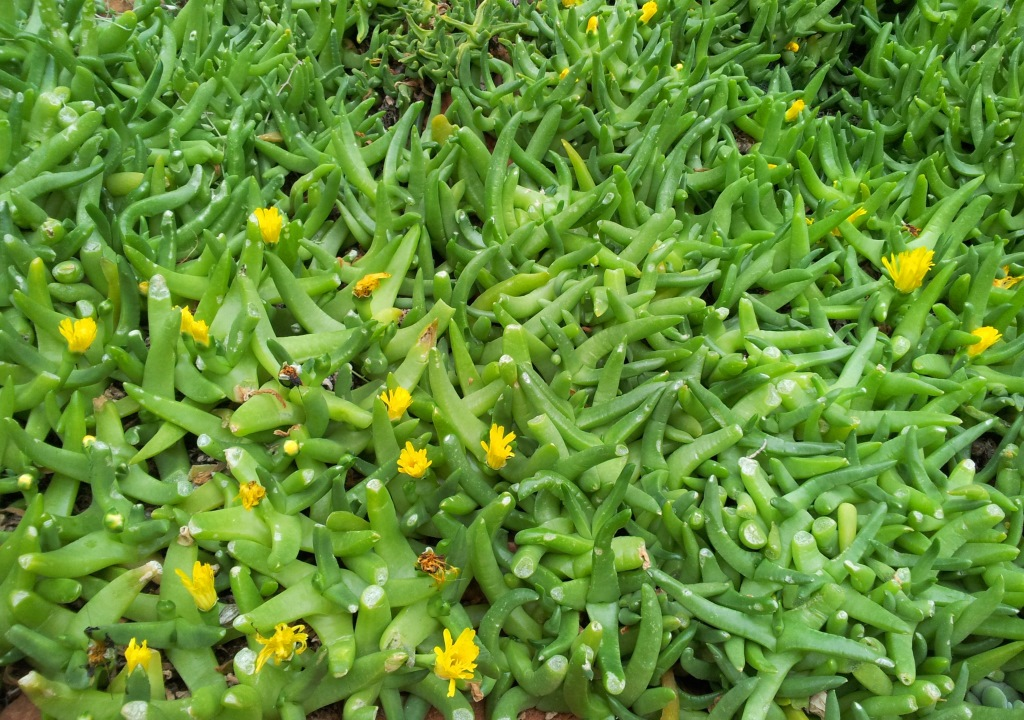
- Glottiphyllum cruciatum can form dense mats

Scientific classification
- Kingdom: Plantae
- Clade: Tracheophytes
- Clade: Angiosperms
- Clade: Eudicots
- Order: Caryophyllales
- Family: Aizoaceae
- Genus: Glottiphyllum
- Species: G. cruciatum

Binomial name
- Glottiphyllum cruciatum (Haw.) N.E.Br.

= Glottiphyllum cruciatum =

Species of succulent

Glottiphyllum cruciatum is a rare species of succulent plant, of the family Aizoaceae. It is indigenous to arid areas near Oudtshoorn in the Western Cape, South Africa. The plant has many synonyms including Glottiphyllum angustum.

== Description ==
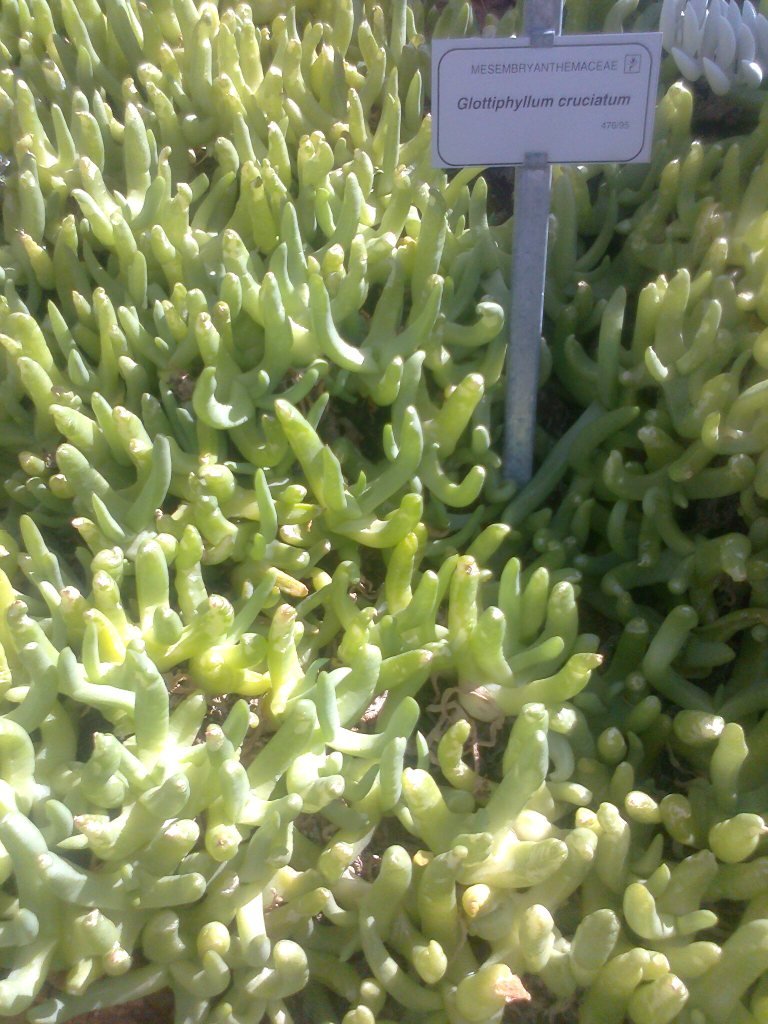
The upturned, fleshy leaf-pairs of G.cruciatum appear in alternating, right-angled arrangement. Each leaf is broadened at its base.

This species has upturned, fleshy leaves that are broadened at the base, and born in pairs. The two leaves in a leaf-pair are a very similar size, unlike many other species of Glottiphyllum. The leaf-pairs grow in a decussate arrangement (each leaf-pair at right angles to the previous one, rather than all in the same two distichous rows).

The stems spread horizontally along the ground and the plant eventually can form large mats.

The seed capsules have very high tops, and their stalks disintegrate quickly after the seeds have been released. This species most resembles its close relative, Glottiphyllum surrectum, which is found further to the west, in the western Little Karoo.

== Distribution ==
The species is restricted to a small part of the central Little Karoo, near the town of Oudtshoorn in South Africa. Here, it co-occurs with its two relatives, Glottiphyllum linguiforme and the very widespread Glottiphyllum depressum.

It is under threat due to Ostrich farming removing its habitat. It is believed that only 250 plants remain on a small one hectare reserve in South Africa.

== Cultivation ==
All Glottiphyllum plants can be grown in small pots in a lean soil with sand and clay and very good drainage. They require very sunny exposure, and need moderate watering in summer and not at all in winter.
