= Lake Rotokauri =

Lake in the North Island of New Zealand

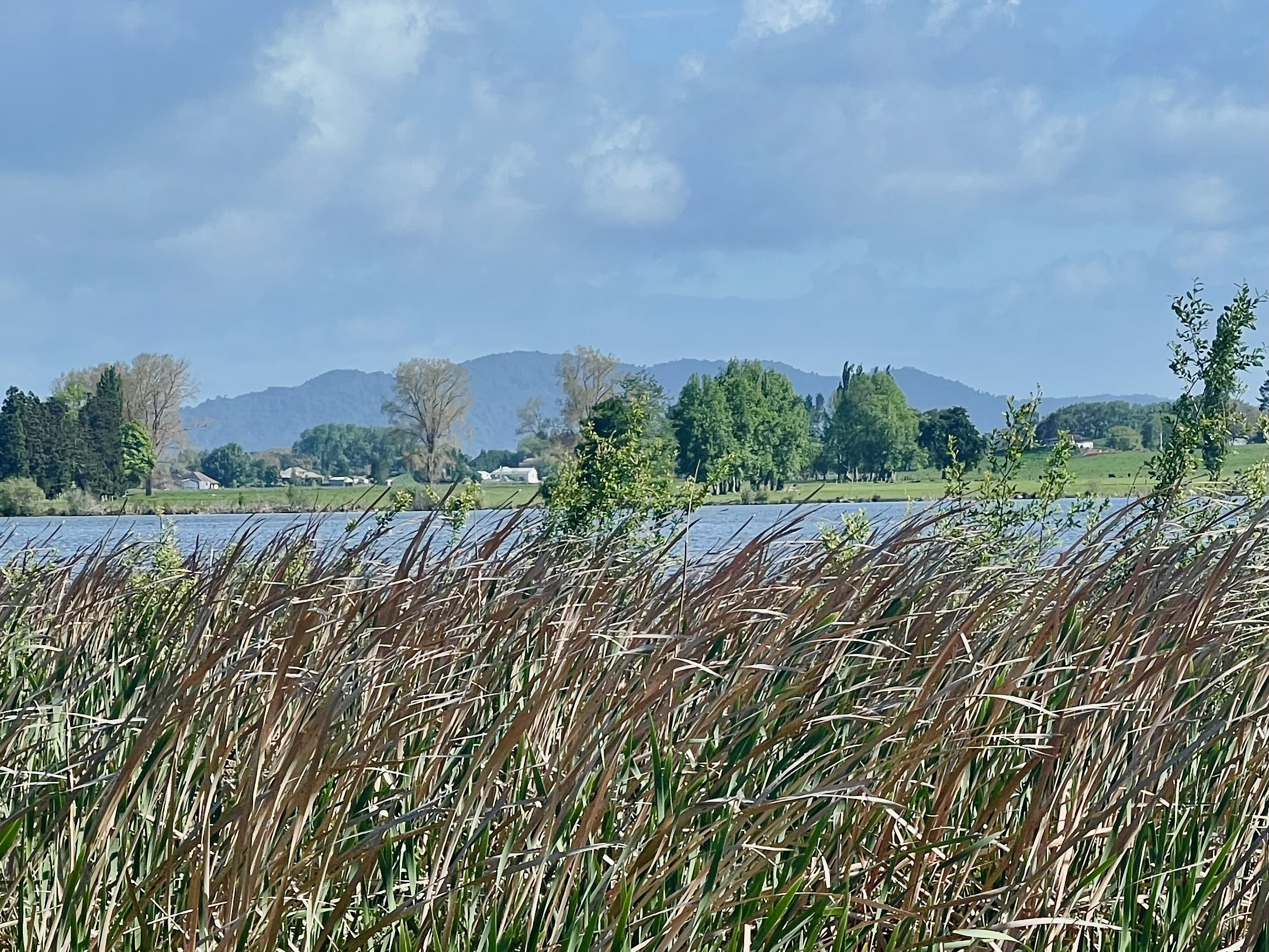
- Lake Rotokauri and Hakarimatas

- Location within North Island
- Location: North Island
- Coordinates: 37°45′45″S 175°11′45″E
- Type: peat
- Primary inflows: Numerous drains including Te Rapa/Rotokauri and Hamilton Zoo drains
- Primary outflows: Ohote Stream
- Catchment area: 9 km^{2} (2,200 acres)
- Basin countries: New Zealand
- Max. length: 1.2 km (0.75 mi)
- Max. width: 0.8 km (0.50 mi)
- Surface area: 77 hectares (190 acres) (open water)
- Max. depth: 4 metres (13 ft)
- Surface elevation: 24 metres (79 ft)

Lake Rotokauri is located approximately 7 km to the northwest of Hamilton, New Zealand. It is a peat lake, and is one of the Waipa Peat lakes.

The lake has a maximum depth of four metres and the open water covers approximately 77 hectares. Lake Rotokauri drains into the Waipā River via the Ohote Stream.

The lake catchment area has a mixture of land uses including residential, industrial and pastoral.

== Etymology ==
In Māori, rotokauri means "kauri lake".

== See also ==
- List of lakes of New Zealand
