= Hamilton Zoo =

Zoo in Hamilton, New Zealand

- Zoo logo
- Interactive map of Hamilton Zoo
- 37.7745°S 175.2148°E
- Date opened: 1969
- Location: Hamilton, New Zealand
- Land area: 25 ha (62 acres)
- No. of animals: 400+
- No. of species: 93+
- Memberships: ZAA
- Major exhibits: Chimpanzee, Sumatran tiger, white rhino, painted hunting dog, small cats, small primates, Free Flight Sanctuary
- Website: hamiltonzoo.co.nz

Hamilton Zoo (Māori: Rawhi Whakaaturanga o Kirikiriroa) is the main zoological garden of Hamilton, New Zealand. Covering 25 hectares (62 acres), it is situated on Brymer Road in the Hamilton suburb of Rotokauri, on the outskirts of the metropolitan area towards the northwest. It is owned by the Hamilton City Council with the Department of Recreation and Welfare handling the day-to-day running of the site.

Hamilton Zoo is the first zoo in New Zealand to become fully accredited by the Zoo and Aquarium Association.

== History ==
The park was founded in 1969 as a game farm, the Hilldale Game Farm. It was originally owned by Murray and Gloria Powell. They mainly raised game birds but there was also a small collection of exotic mammals and birds.

The zoo become unprofitable and was facing closure in 1976 before the Hamilton City Council stepped in and bought the site, buildings, and stock. In 1984, the zoo again faced closure but due to public pressure the Council resolved to keep it open. Day-to-day running of the zoo was transferred to the Department of Recreation and Welfare.

A concept plan was drawn up to give the zoo a clear direction, this resulted in the Zoo Education Centre opening in 1987. The plan also called for upgraded and new exhibits, plantings, boardwalks, and paths.

The position of zoo director was created in 1989.

Hamilton Zoo received its first red panda, Mungojerre, in November 1999. He was joined by his father, Mario, in February 2000 and another male Laotzy in December 2001. Mario died in April 2002. In July 2006, Laotzy was sent to the National Zoo in Canberra and Mungojerre to Brooklands Zoo. The following month, brothers Chito and Badal arrived from Auckland Zoo. Badal escaped soon after arriving and died four days later after being hit by a car. A female red panda, Tayla, arrived in October 2010 from the National Zoo. She was the daughter of Laotzy. In December 2011, Tayla gave birth to a son. He was named Ketu, meaning 'comet' in Tibetan. Tayla gave birth to male triplets in 2012. They received names from the Nepalese language: Nima (sun), Karma (star) and Dawa (moon). Ketu was sent to Kansas Zoo in August 2013. Tayla's third litter, twin females, were born in January 2014. This brings the number of red pandas at Hamilton Zoo to seven.

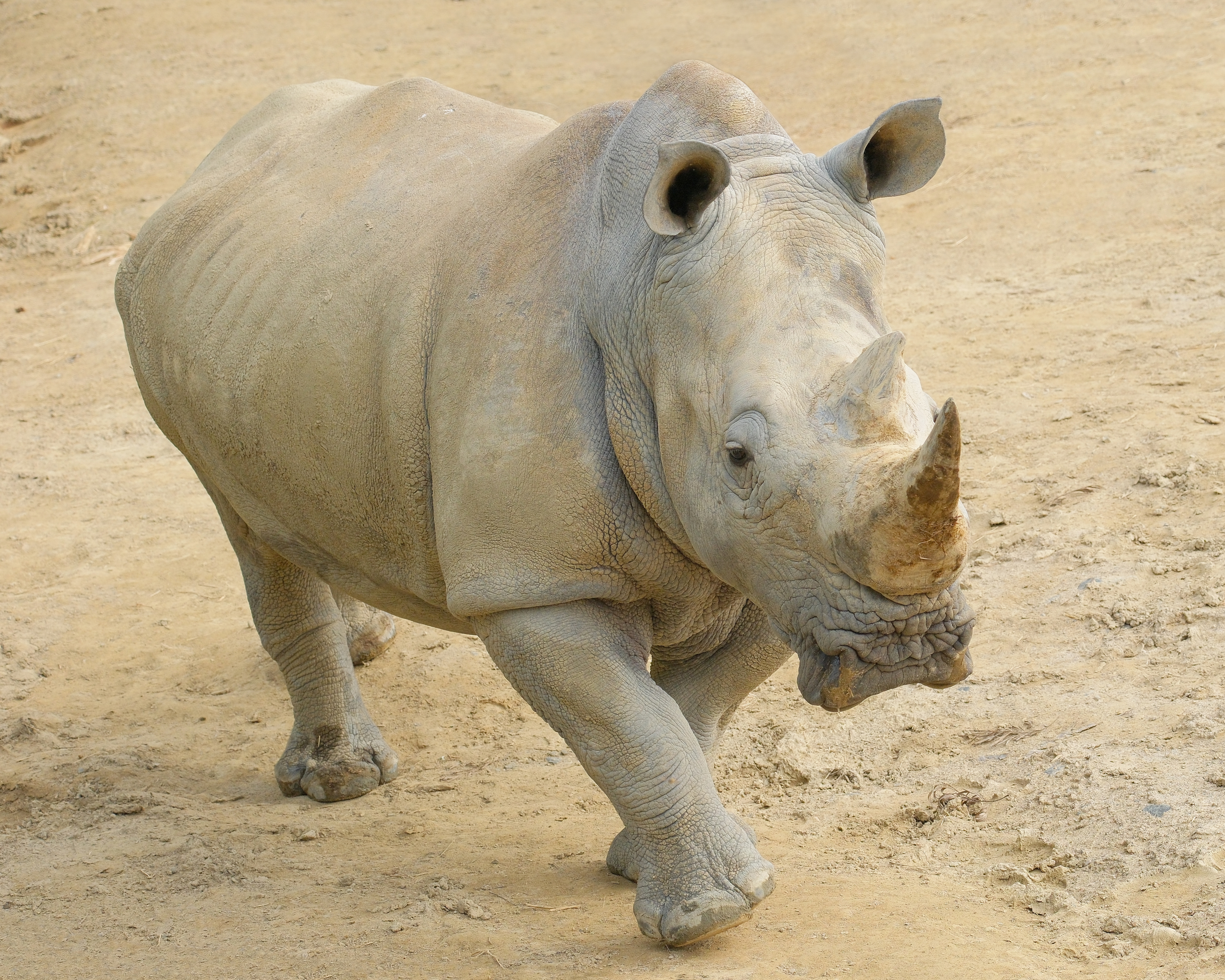
Southern white rhinoceros at Hamilton Zoo

In October 1999, Hamilton Zoo received three southern white rhinoceros from Kruger National Park, South Africa. Eight-year-old bull, Zambezi, and five-year-old cows, Moesha and Caballe, were part of an Australsian import of white rhinoceros, which were sent to the Auckland, Hamilton, Werribee Open Range and Perth Zoos. They were later joined by a four-year-old female, Kito, from Auckland Zoo in 2004. In January 2002, Caballe gave birth to a son, Inkosi. She had another son, Mtoto, in February 2004, and a daughter, Imani, in March 2007. In May 2007, Zambezi, Inkosi and Mtoto were sent to Auckland Zoo in exchange for their bull, Kruger. Moesha gave birth to a son, Kifaru, in April 2009 and a daughter, Jamila, in March 2012. In August 2010, Caballe, pregnant with her fourth calf, was sent to Australia Zoo. Kito gave birth to a son, Ubuntu, in March 2010 and a stillborn daughter in April 2013. In March 2014, young bulls, Kifaru and Ubuntu, were sent to the National Zoo in Canberra. The Hamilton Zoo herd currently consists of bull, Kruger, and cows, Moesha, Kito, Imani and Jamila.

In November 1999, a one-year bull giraffe, Ndoki, arrived from Wellington Zoo. He was joined by purebred Rothchild's bulls, Makulu, from Orana Wildlife Park in 2000 and Chitumbii, from Perth Zoo in 2001. Shortly after his arrival, Chitumbi was chased into a fence by a zebra stallion. He initially appeared fine, but his condition later deteriorated and he died in January 2002. Initially, Hamilton Zoo intended to import a female for breeding, but the species coordinator recommended they operate as a holder for surplus bulls, creating a bachelor herd. In April 2004, 15-month-old bulls, Masmamba and Jabari arrived from Auckland Zoo. They were later joined by young bulls, Ndale, in 2005, and Dume, in 2007. All four young bulls were born at Auckland Zoo between 2002 and 2006 and were fathered by Makulu's older brother, Zabulu.

In January 2000, construction started on a sumatran tiger exhibit. It was completed in January 2001 and cost $430,000. It features a large pool, climbing structures and bamboo glades. In March 2001, 14-month-old Sumatran tiger siblings, male Jaka, and females Mencari and Molek, arrived from Wellington Zoo. Although not originally intended to breed, the death of their sister, Nisha in May 2006 caused the species coordinator to recommend one of the Hamilton Zoo females to take her place. As the more confident female, Molek was chosen and she was sent to Auckland Zoo that September. In July 2012, Hamilton Zoo received a four-year-old tigress, Sali, from Dreamworld on the Gold Coast. She is the zoo's potential breeding female after Mencari was spayed in 2010. In November 2013, Hamilton Zoo sent their male, Jaka, to Auckland Zoo in exchange for their male, Oz. Jaka is Sali's great uncle (the brother of Sali's grandmother) and considered too closely related for breeding. Introductions between Oz and Sali are progressing well with the zoo hoping for cubs in the near future.

In November 2001, Hamilton Zoo received two cheetah from Cango Wildlife Ranch, South Africa. Two year old female, Temba, and her half brother, one year old, Mwandi. In 2003, Mwandi was sent to Orana Wildlife Park to breed, in exchange for one of their males to breed with Temba. Unfortunately this was unsuccessful with Temba showing little interest in the new male, Kaitoa. In August 2007, Temba and Kaitoa were sent to Orana Wildlife Park, who have had repeated success in breeding cheetah, due to their wide pool of potential mates for the female cheetah to choose from. In September 2007, brothers, Moyo Matusi and Jambo, arrived from Western Plains Zoo, where they had been born in 2004. They are not intended for breeding in the immediate future.

In March 2003, Hamilton Zoo's otters, Moba and Jasmine, produced five pups which unfortunately died of a mystery illness. They produced four more pups in April 2004, but first Moba and Jasmine, then the four pups died of the same illness between September 2004 and June 2005. After deciding to discontinue exhibiting otter, they were first replaced by agouiti, then meerkat since 2010.

In June 2004, Hamilton Zoo completed construction on a 3,000 square metre exhibit for chimpanzees. The exhibit features two large fields, divided by an overhead swing bridge, a forest area, a water feature and a large multi-storey night house, with public viewing windows. In July, six chimpanzee, Susie, Sally, Mike, Lucy, Lucifer and Luka, arrived from Auckland Zoo. In December 2008, mother and daughter, Fimi and Sanda, arrived from Adelaide Zoo. The intention was for them to breed with teenage brothers, Lucifer and Luka, or their father, Mike. Susie died of cancer in November 2010, and in March 2011, Mike died after an operation to amputate his arm. The top of Mike's finger had been bitten off, following an altercation with Luca, and while antibiotics were prescribed, the infection quickly spread to his arm. Fimi was put down in April 2012, following advanced heart failure, causing major changes to the chimpanzee community. Ongoing conflicts between Fimi and Luka, the dominant male, had led to the keepers having to separate the chimpanzee into two groups, with Luka and Lucifer in one group, and Fimi, Sally, Lucy and Sanda in the other. Fimi's death allowed the reintroduction of the two groups, with Sally taking on a role of surrogate mother to Fimi's daughter, Sanda. The zoo is hoping Sanda will breed with Luka or Lucifer in the near future.

In July 2009, Hamilton Zoo received two siamang gibbons from Auckland Zoo, 30-year-old female, Iuri, and 25-year-old male, Itam. The pair had been retired from breeding, having produced several offspring during their time at Auckland Zoo, and were sent to Hamilton to live out their retirement years.

In 2014, Hamilton Zoo's one of two female Sumatran tigers, Sali, gave birth to two tiger cubs.

On 20 September 2015, Hamilton Zoo's Curator Samantha Kudeweh was killed by a male Sumatran tiger, named Oz.

Two new Sumatran tiger cubs were born at the zoo on 3 January 2024.

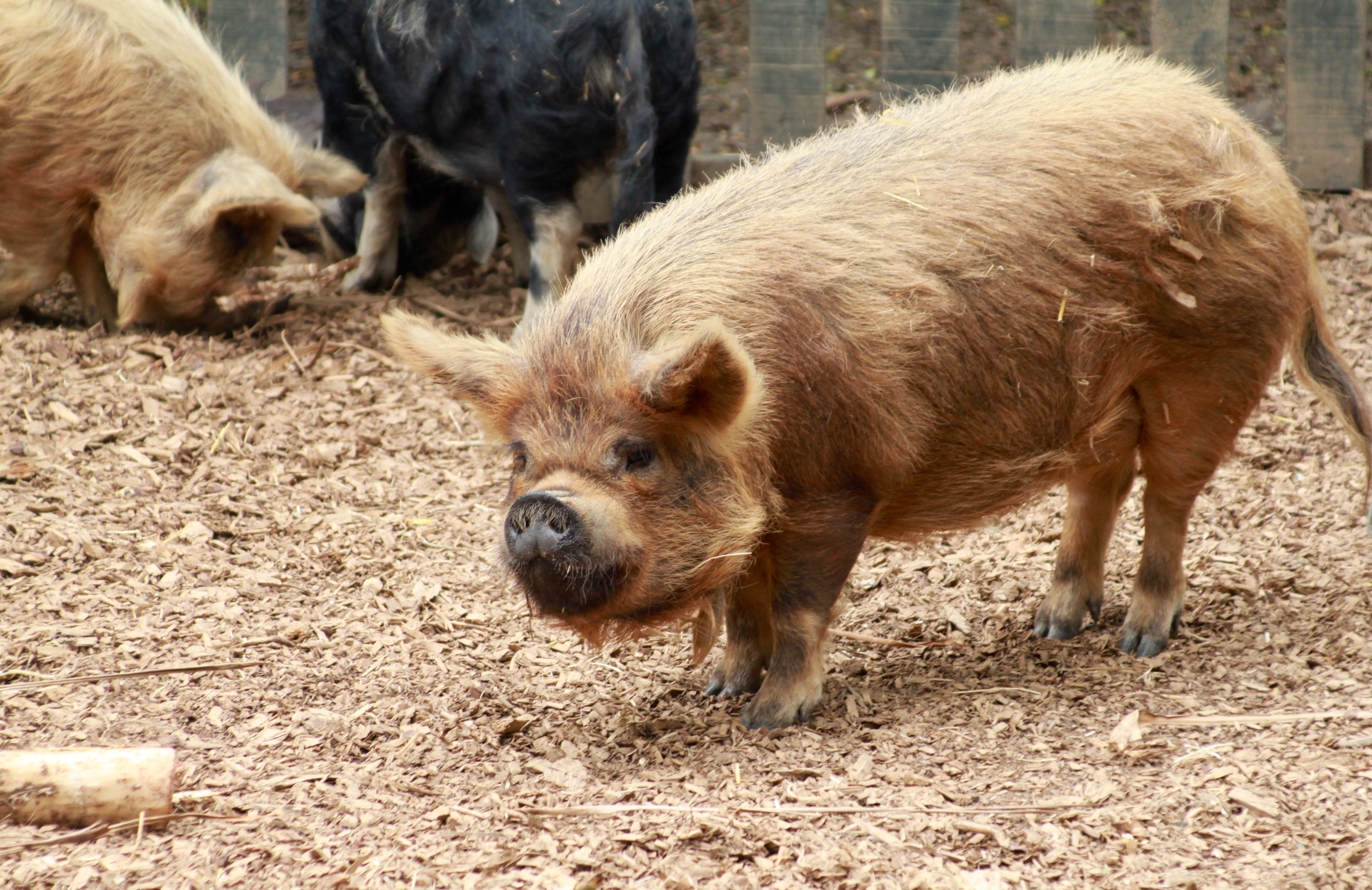
Kunekune pigs at Hamilton Zoo

== Exhibits ==
The zoo features a number of exhibits, some unique to the zoo. The zoo has over 200 bird species.

- Parrot Court – contains Australasian, South American and Indonesian parrots, including sun conures, blue-and-yellow macaws, scarlet macaws and princess parakeets.
- Free Flight Sanctuary – this is one of the largest free-flight aviaries in the Southern Hemisphere, housing a variety of native New Zealand birds including kākās.
- Reptile Rows – this includes tuataras, native geckos, native skinks, lace monitors, eastern snake necked turtle and leopard tortoise. There's also an exhibit for native frogs too.
- Chimpanzee Exhibit – this exhibit features the zoo's chimpanzee troop of six, Sally, Lucy, Lucifer, Luka, Sanda and Chiku. The exhibit is 1.2 hectares.
- African Painted Dogs – the zoo currently has four African painted dogs, two females and two males.
- Tiger Exhibit – the zoo currently has three Sumatran tigers, three females.
- Waikato Wetlands – this area of the zoo has recreated to represent a local wetlands area for the Waikato region. Kept here are keas and New Zealand falcons. There are also black swans and other water birds on the lake, surrounded by a boardwalk.
- African Animals – one side of the zoo contains mainly animals from Africa including popular species such as southern white rhinos, plains zebras (including individuals from the Grant's clade), ostriches, cheetah, helmeted guineafowl, and giraffes. The zoo's herd of American bison, European fallow deer and blackbuck are also located in this area.
- Other species at the zoo include siamangs, black-handed spider monkeys, brown capuchins, ring-tailed lemurs, black-and-white ruffed lemurs, caracal, fishing cats, red pandas, meerkats, cape porcupines, ferrets, kunekune pigs, moreporks and blue ducks.

== Future developments ==
No major future developments are currently scheduled for the zoo. However, there are some minor works planned, including an upgrade to the giraffe accommodation.
