= Max Rose (businessman) =

Lithuanian-born South African ostrich feather magnate (1873–1951)

- Born: 1873; Shavli, Kovno Governorate, Russian Empire
- Died: August 21, 1951 (aged 77–78); Oudtshoorn, Western Cape, South Africa
- Citizenship: South African
- Occupations: Entrepreneur, ostrich farmer, industrialist
- Years active: 1890s–1951

Max Rose (1873–August 21, 1951) was a Russian-born, South African businessman and ostrich farmer who became a leading figure in the Cape ostrich feather industry. He became known as the "ostrich feather king of South Africa."

== Early life ==
Max Rose was born to a large Jewish family in 1873 in Shavli (now Šiauliai), then part of the Russian Empire (present-day Lithuania). Along with some of his siblings, he immigrated to South Africa in 1890 at the age of 17, settling in the town of Oudtshoorn in the Western Cape.

== Career ==
Rose began as a feather buyer and later became an ostrich farmer. He acquired his first farm in Ladismith and studied the breeding and dietary habits of ostriches, notably planting and irrigating large tracts of lucerne (alfalfa) to feed them. He was one of the first farmers in the region to irrigate lucerne and shipped it by rail across South Africa to support the growing industry.

Rose studied ostrich breeding, feather development, and the birds’ life cycle, and local farmers consulted him about breeding and the feather trade. He studied ostrich behavior and development from hatching to old age. Rose was also well informed about international feather markets, and local farmers often consulted him during various phases of the industry's development.

By the early 1900s, Rose had become the leading feather buyer and farmer in Oudtshoorn and a wealthy man. The collapse of the ostrich feather boom in 1914 caused financial ruin for many, including Rose. While most farmers slaughtered or released their ostriches, Rose continued feeding his birds, convinced the industry would recover.

The South African government appointed Rose to a commission of inquiry on the depressed state of the ostrich industry.

== Revival of the ostrich industry ==
The ostrich industry revived during the 1940s. At that time, Rose owned 20 percent of the approximately 20,000 ostriches in South Africa, compared to the peak of 870,000 birds in 1914.

He was introduced to the British royal family during their 1947 visit to Oudtshoorn. Queen Elizabeth’s fashion interest in ostrich feathers was credited with partially reviving the feather trade. Rose returned to profitable ostrich farming and remained active in the industry until his death.

== Personal life and death ==
A lifelong bachelor, Rose lived most of his life in the Oudtshoorn region, although he often traveled to Europe on business. Rose lent money to local farmers without written contracts and made annual donations to Zionist, Jewish, and local charities.

Rose died on August 21, 1951 and is buried in the Oudtshoorn Jewish cemetery.
