= Denovan Ekstraal =

South African cricketer

Denovan Ekstraal (born 18 February 1987) was a South African cricketer. He was a right-handed batsman and a right-arm medium-fast bowler who played for South Western Districts. He was born in Oudtshoorn.

Ekstraal made a single first-class appearance for the team, during the 2006-07 campaign, against Kei. As a tailender, Ekstraal did not get a chance to bat as the team's first-innings allocation was limited to just 85 overs. Ekstraal conceded just one run from the three overs he bowled in the first innings of the game, while in his second innings of bowling, he took 3-12 from seven overs.
