= Pauline Smith =

South African writer

- Born: Pauline Janet Smith; 2 April 1882; Oudtshoorn, Cape Colony
- Died: 29 January 1959 (aged 76); Dorset, England, United Kingdom
- Occupation: Novelist
- Writing career
- Language: English

Pauline Janet Smith (2 April 1882 – 29 January 1959) was a South African novelist, short story writer, memoirist and playwright.

== Life ==
Pauline Smith was born on 2 April 1882 in Oudtshoorn, South Africa, and grew up in the Little Karoo. She was the elder of two daughters born to Herbert Urmson Smith, an English doctor, and his Scottish wife Jessie, from Aberdeen. At the age of thirteen she was sent to boarding school in Scotland. Smith never lived permanently in South Africa again, though throughout her life she made a number of extended visits to the country. Her extended visit of 1913–1914, and the journal that she kept, formed the basis of many stories of The Little Karoo and her novel The Beadle.

In 1908 she met the English novelist Arnold Bennett, who encouraged her to write fiction about South Africa. Eventually she published the two works for which she is best known: the story collection The Little Karoo (1925), and the novel The Beadle (1926).

Smith was also a friend of Frank Swinnerton.

She died on 29 January 1959 in Dorset, England. A collection of her papers are held at the University of Cape Town.

== Works ==
- The Little Karoo. London : Jonathan Cape, 1925. With an introduction by Arnold Bennett.
- The Beadle. New York: Doran, 1927.
- A.B.: "... a minor marginal note". London: Jonathan Cape, 1933.
- Platkops Children. London, England: Cape, 1935.
- Hold Yourself Dear New York: J. Messner, 1965.
