= 1936 South African census =

1936 national census in South Africa

1936 National Census
← 1921	5 May 1936	1946 →

General information
- Country: Union of South Africa

Results
- Total population: 9,589,898 (▲38.4%)
- Most populous region: Cape of Good Hope
- Least populous region: Orange Free State

The National Census of 1936 was the 3rd comprehensive national census of the Union of South Africa, following its formation in 1910. It undertook to enumerate every person present in South Africa on the census night. It was the first South African census to tabulate non-European languages and languages spoken at home by all major demographic groups.

== Results ==
=== Demographics ===
Population change in the South Africa by province
Province	1921 Census	1936 Census	Difference	Percentage difference
Cape of Good Hope	2,782,719	3,529,900	747,181	26.85%▲
Natal	1,429,398	1,946,468	517,070	36.17%▲
Transvaal	2,087,636	3,341,470	1,253,834	60.06%▲
Orange Free State	628,827	772,060	143,233	22.78%▲
Total	6,928,580	9,589,898	2,661,318	38.41%▲

Population change in the South Africa by race
Race (Census term)	1921 Census		1936 Census		Percentage difference		Average annual growth rate: 1921 to 1936
Race (Census term)	Number	Percentage of population	Number	Percentage of population	Number	Percentage	Average annual growth rate: 1921 to 1936
Black African (Native)	4,697,813	67.8%	6,596,689	68.79%	1,898,876	40.42%▲	2.29%
Coloured	545,548	7.87%	769,661	8.03%	224,113	41.08%▲	2.32%
Asian or Indian (Asiatic)	165,731	2.39%	219,691	2.29%	53,960	32.56%▲	1.90%
White (European)	1,519,488	21.93%	2,003,857	20.9%	484,369	31.88%▲	1.86%
Total	6,928,580	100%	9,589,898	100%	2,661,318	38.41%▲	2.19%

=== City rankings ===
Largest urban areas: total population
City/Town	Province	Population
Johannesburg	Transvaal	519,384
Cape Town	Cape of Good Hope	344,223
Durban	Natal	259,606
Pretoria	Transvaal	128,621
Port Elizabeth	Cape of Good Hope	109,841
Springs	Transvaal	86,874
Germiston	Transvaal	79,440
Benoni	Transvaal	77,760
Bloemfontein	Orange Free State	64,233
East London	Cape of Good Hope	60,563
Brakpan	Transvaal	54,811
Krugersdorp	Transvaal	54,810
Boksburg	Transvaal	50,126
Pietermaritzburg	Natal	49,539
Roodepoort	Transvaal	41,572
Kimberley	Cape of Good Hope	40,231
Randfontein	Transvaal	28,763
Nigel	Transvaal	21,732
Uitenhage	Cape of Good Hope	20,584
Grahamstown	Cape of Good Hope	19,773
Potchefstroom	Transvaal	19,099
Vereeniging	Transvaal	18,867
Paarl	Cape of Good Hope	18,579
Queenstown	Cape of Good Hope	18,255
Kroonstad	Orange Free State	13,378
Oudtshoorn	Cape of Good Hope	13,229
Worcester	Cape of Good Hope	12,486
Graaf-Reinet	Cape of Good Hope	11,984
King Williams Town	Cape of Good Hope	10,669
Bethlehem	Orange Free State	10,379
Ladysmith	Natal	9,702
Cradock	Cape of Good Hope	9,260
Harrismith	Orange Free State	9,213
Pietersburg	Transvaal	9,135
George	Cape of Good Hope	9,075
Klerksdorp	Transvaal	8,943
Stellenbosch	Cape of Good Hope	8,782

== See also ==
- Census in South Africa
- South African National Census of 2001
- Demographics of South Africa
