= Dutch Reformed Church, Oudtshoorn =

Church in Oudtshoorn, South Africa

Dutch Reformed Church
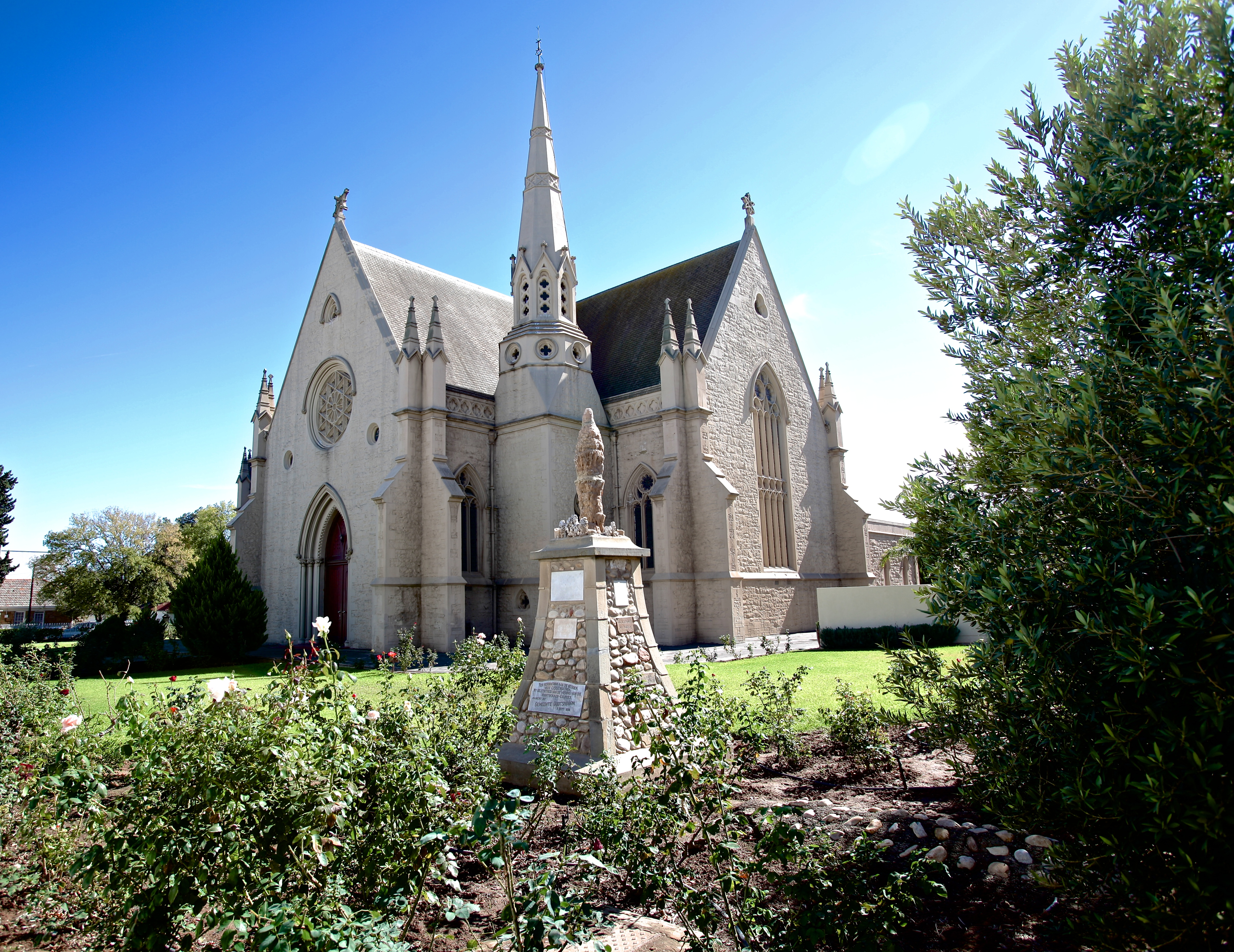
- Location: Oudtshoorn
- Country: South Africa
- Denomination: Nederduits Gereformeerde Kerk

History
- Founded: 1853

Architecture
- Functional status: Church

The Dutch Reformed Church in Oudtshoorn is the mother congregation of the Dutch Reformed Church in Oudtshoorn, the main town of the Klein Karoo.

== Background ==
Although the earliest pioneers reached this region in 1750, the congregation of Oudtshoorn was not established until 11 October 1853. Until 1798, when the congregation of Swellendam was established, the people in this region fell under the congregation of Tulbagh, but with the establishment of the congregation of Swellendam the church was brought somewhat closer.

When the congregation of George was established in 1812, the civilizing influence of the church came much closer with this step and, had it not been for the almost insurmountable Outeniqua Mountains, Oudtshoorn would have been placed almost immediately within reach of the church privileges. From this time Oudtshoorn fell under George and for the first time a church council member was elected for this ward. Rev. T.J. Herold of George was also the first minister to work this region.

== Ministers ==
- Jacobus Wilhelmus Snyman, 1919–1921
- Schalk Kotze, January 1996 – end of 2016
- Smuts Janse van Rensburg, from 1 January 2017
- Albé Theunissen from 2022
