= Cango Wildlife Ranch =

Wildlife ranch in Oudtshoorn, South Africa

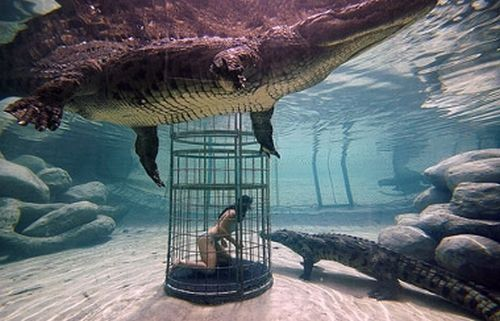
- Crocodile cage diving at Cango

- location in South Africa
- 33°33′58.3″S 22°12′51.0″E
- Location: Baron van Reede Street outside Oudtshoorn (on road to Cango Caves)
- Region: Western Cape

Site notes
- Website: https://www.cango.co.za/

The Cango Wildlife Ranch is a wildlife ranch, situated 3 kilometres (1.9 mi) north of the town of Oudtshoorn in South Africa.

It was established as a crocodile ranch in 1976 by Andrew and Glenn Eriksen, who opened it as a crocodile show farm to the public the following year, the first to be established in South Africa. Over 400 crocodiles and alligators are bred at the ranch, and while crocodiles are still bred there, and has also become a general zoo and breeding centre for other animals, which Pat Hopkins has referred to as "arguably the most exotic petting zoo in Africa".

Cango Wildlife Ranch is now reportedly a world-class breeding centre for cheetah, and is home to the Cheetah Preservation Foundation, which was established in 1988. The ranch has also bred aardwolf, African wild dog and pygmy hippo.
