= CP Nel Museum =

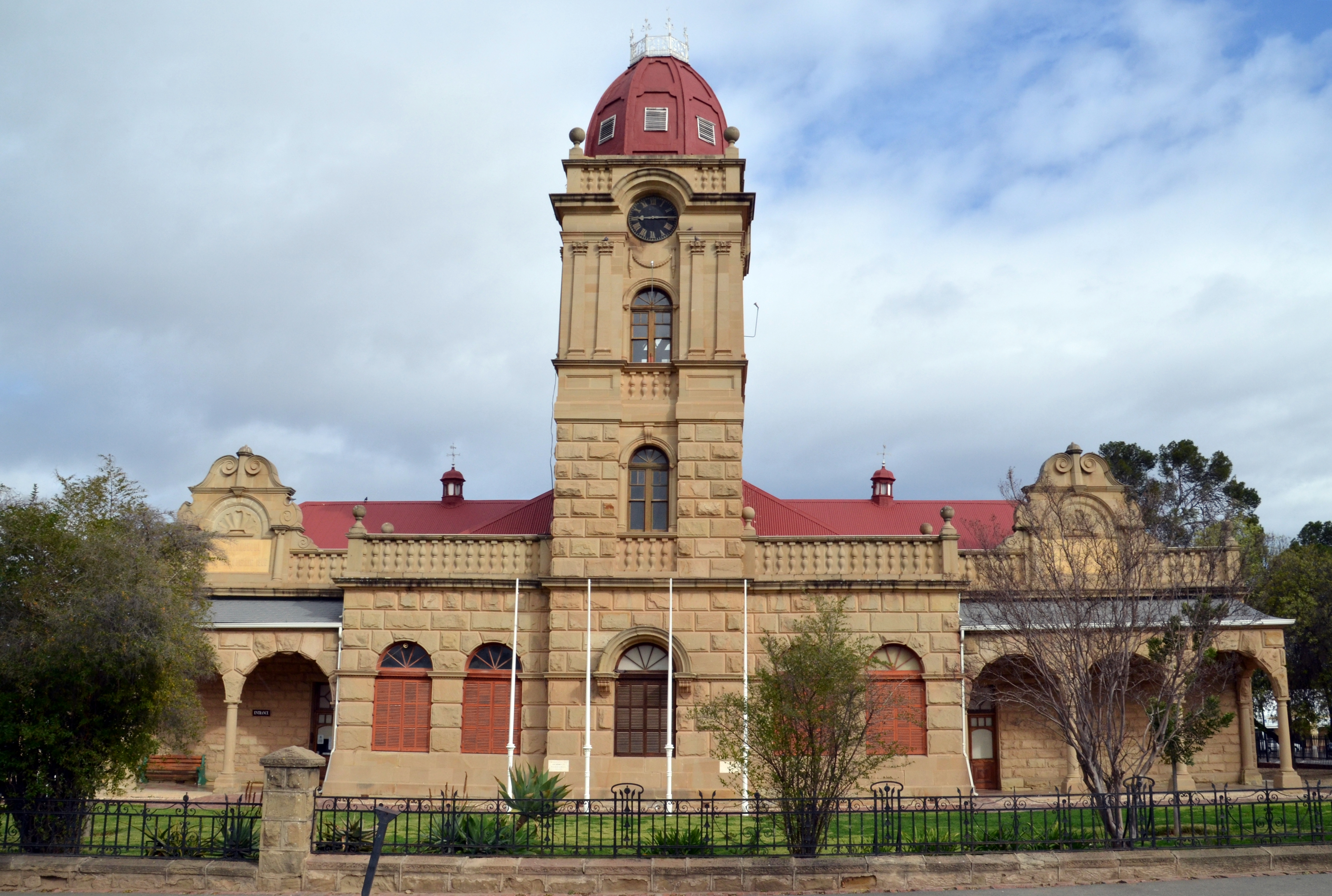
- The facade of the museum building.
- Established: 1972
- Location: Oudtshoorn, Western Cape
- Coordinates: 33°35′31.46″S 22°12′8.08″E
- Type: History museum
- Website: www.cpnelmuseum.co.za

The CP Nel Museum is a museum in Oudtshoorn, South Africa, which houses exhibits depicting the role of the ostrich trade in the town's history, as well as the cultural history and lifestyle of the people of the Little Karoo region, as it was during the Victorian era and early 20th century.

== History ==
The original building was designed and erected in 1906 by a local British architect, Charles Bullock, and was opened in 1907 as the Oudtshoorn Boys' High School. A school hall was added to the building in 1912 by J.E. Vixeboxse.

By 1963, when Oudtshoorn's single-sex schools were amalgamated, the building was in such a state of disrepair that it was almost demolished. However, a petition by the school's alumni convinced the National Monuments Commission to withdraw this recommendation. The Education Department decided instead to sell the building. It was renamed in honour of Colonel CP Nel, who had bequeathed a valuable collection of antiques to the public. These antiques were transferred to the building in 1972, and the CP Nel Museum was officially opened.

In 1979, the building was declared a national monument.

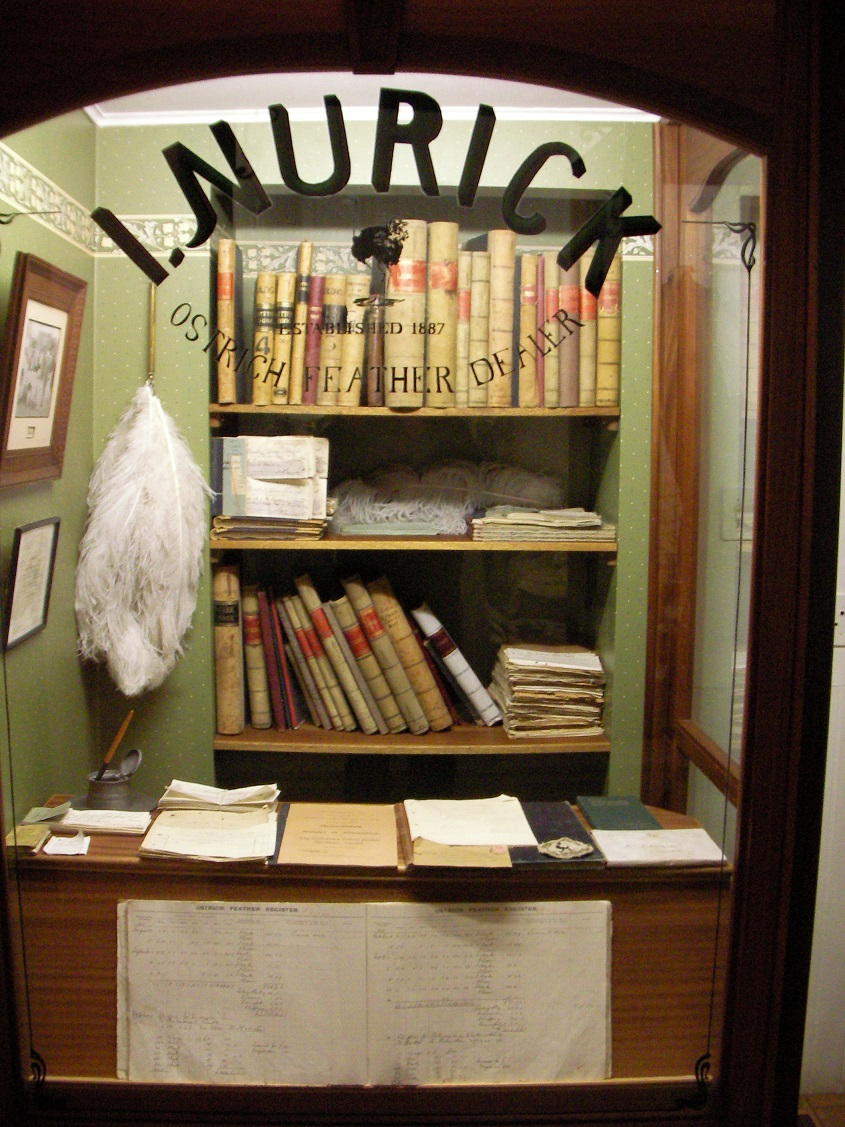
A replica of an ostrich feather dealer's office at the museum.

== Present ==
The school hall has been repurposed as the "Ostrich Hall" in order to exhibit the history of the ostrich in the Little Karoo's development. It includes in its displays a rock that has carved into it an image of running ostriches, which was discovered in the Sahara Desert. "Feather-boom fashions" are also on display. The museum also exhibits an early 20th-century pharmacy; a crockery collection; military history and weapons; musical instruments; and a garage of historical vehicles.

The CP Nel Museum is one of a few secular museums in the world to house a synagogue. At the suggestion of Isidore Barron, who had been a member of the museum's Board of Trustees, the Jewish gallery was opened in 1973. This room is a reconstruction of the old St. John Street Synagogue as it was in 1896, and depicts the contribution of Oudtshoorn's Lithuanian Jewish community to the ostrich industry. The synagogue is still occasionally used for services.

The ticket price includes admission to the Le Roux Townhouse, which is decorated in authentic Victorian-era furniture, and depicts a "feather palace" during the Ostrich booms.

In 2014, the museum updated its material to recognise the historical forced removals of non-whites from Oudtshoorn, and made its explanatory notes available in English, Afrikaans, and Xhosa, the three official provincial languages of the Western Cape.

== Architecture ==
The building is a specimen of late Victorian, Colonial-style architecture, and the hall is built in the New Republican style.

The museum's 30-metre-high clock tower is adorned with Corinthian ornaments and is topped with a wrought-iron dome. The clock was made in England in 1902, and was transported in parts to Mossel Bay and then over the Outeniqua Mountains via ox-wagon. It had been ordered by Oudtshoorn resident Pierre Olivier in 1904, who decided to donate it to what was then the local boys' school. The clock was built into the tower in 1907.

The building's sandstone facade is considered one of the finest examples of stone masonry in the Little Karoo. Willem Adriaan Cruywagen, the Minister of National Education who declared the building a national monument, gave the following reasoning for the certification:

Designed in part by Bullock and Vixseboxe, the well known architects, it reflects the former's copiousness and the latter's Transvaal Republic influence. Especially worthy of note is the facade, with its harmonious blending of styles and its impressive dome tower. [...]
