= Highgate Ostrich Show Farm =

Coordinates: 33°39′31″S 22°8′8″E

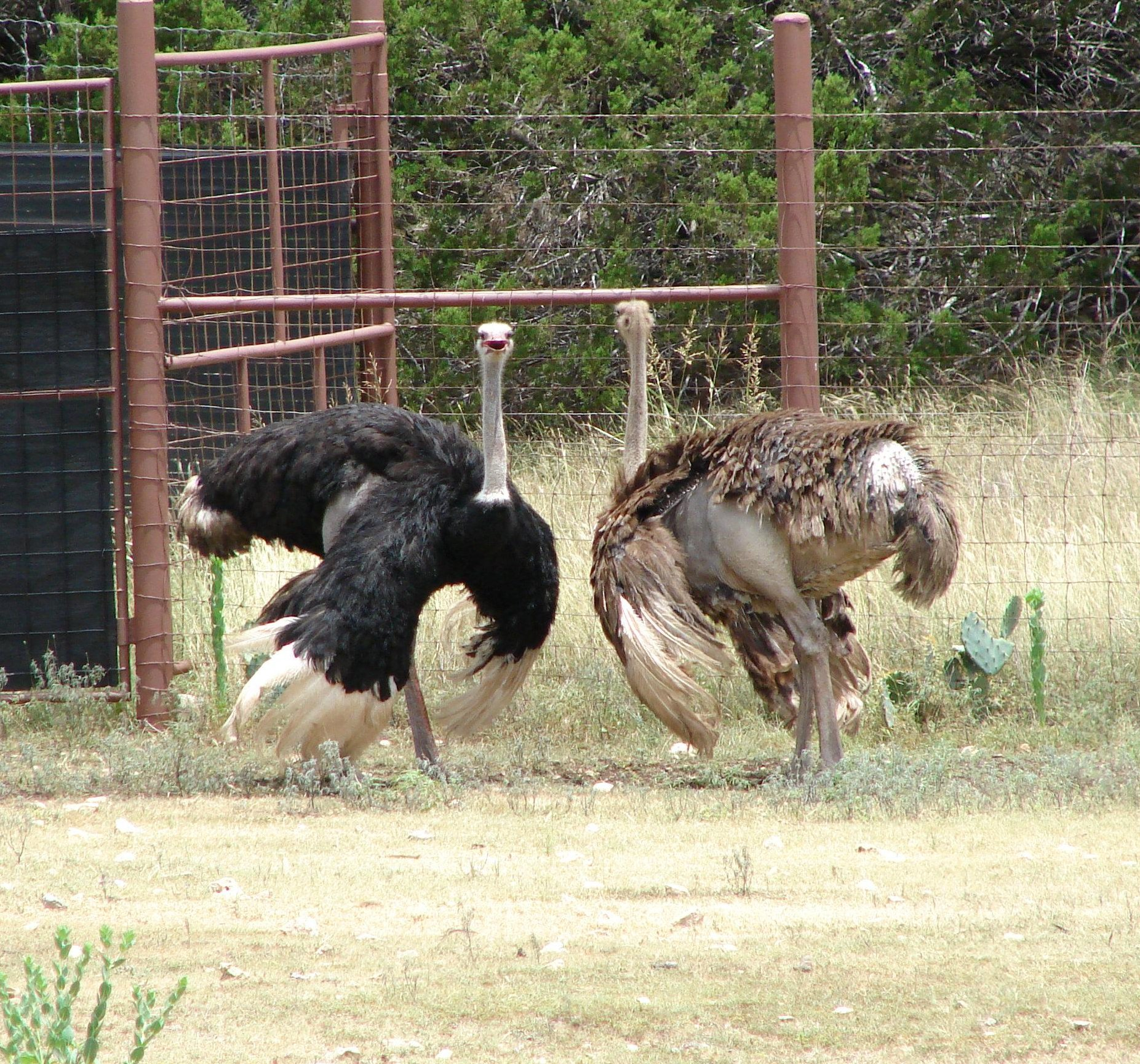
A male and female ostrich

The Highgate Ostrich Show Farm is an ostrich farm located 10 kilometres south of Oudtshoorn in the Western Cape, South Africa.

This large farm specialises in the breeding of ostriches and is open to visitors. It offers specialised information about the various stages of the species' life and reproduction cycle and provides visitors with the opportunity to visit young offspring and view ostrich pens.

While its primary focus is farming ostriches, tourism is an important source of income and keeps the farm running.

Other ostrich farms in the area include Safari Show Farm.

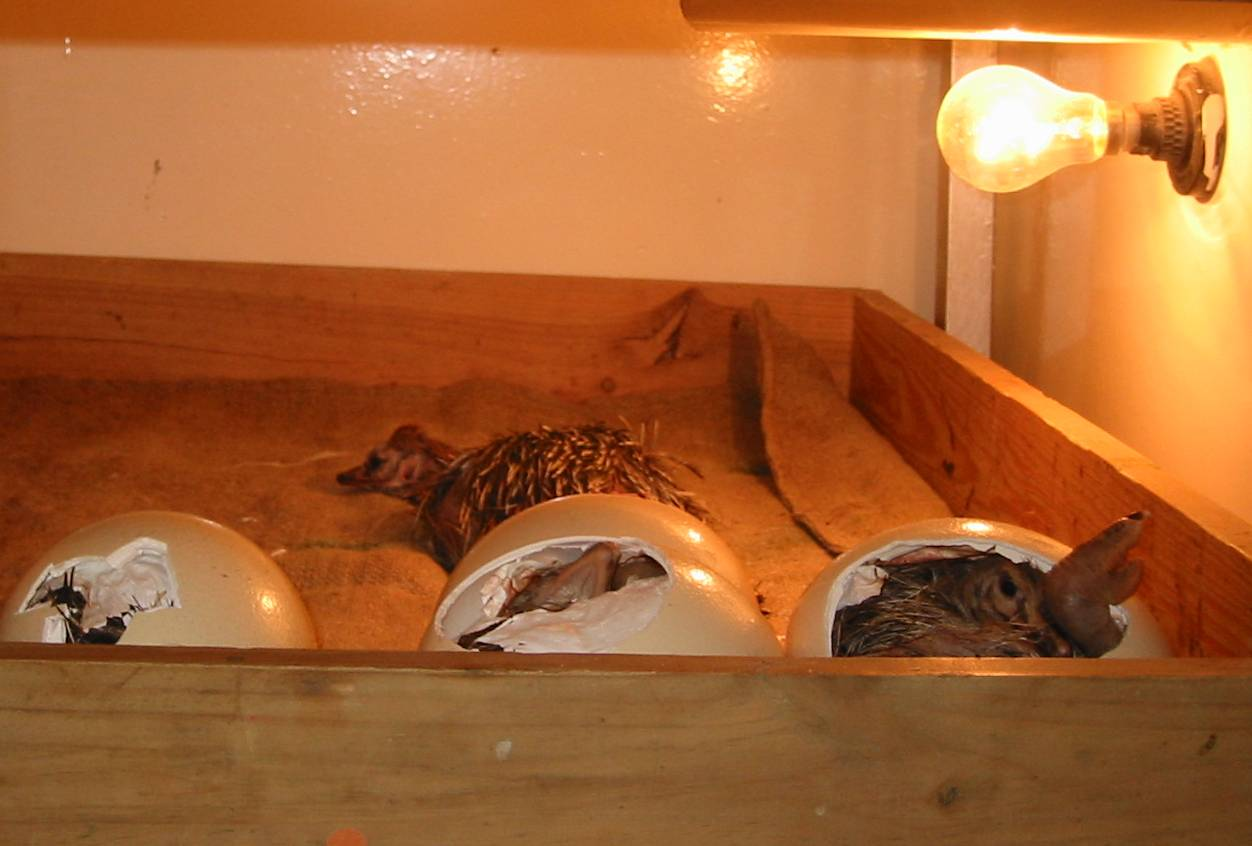
Hatching ostriches
