= Cango Caves =

Limestone cave system in the Western Cape Province of South Africa

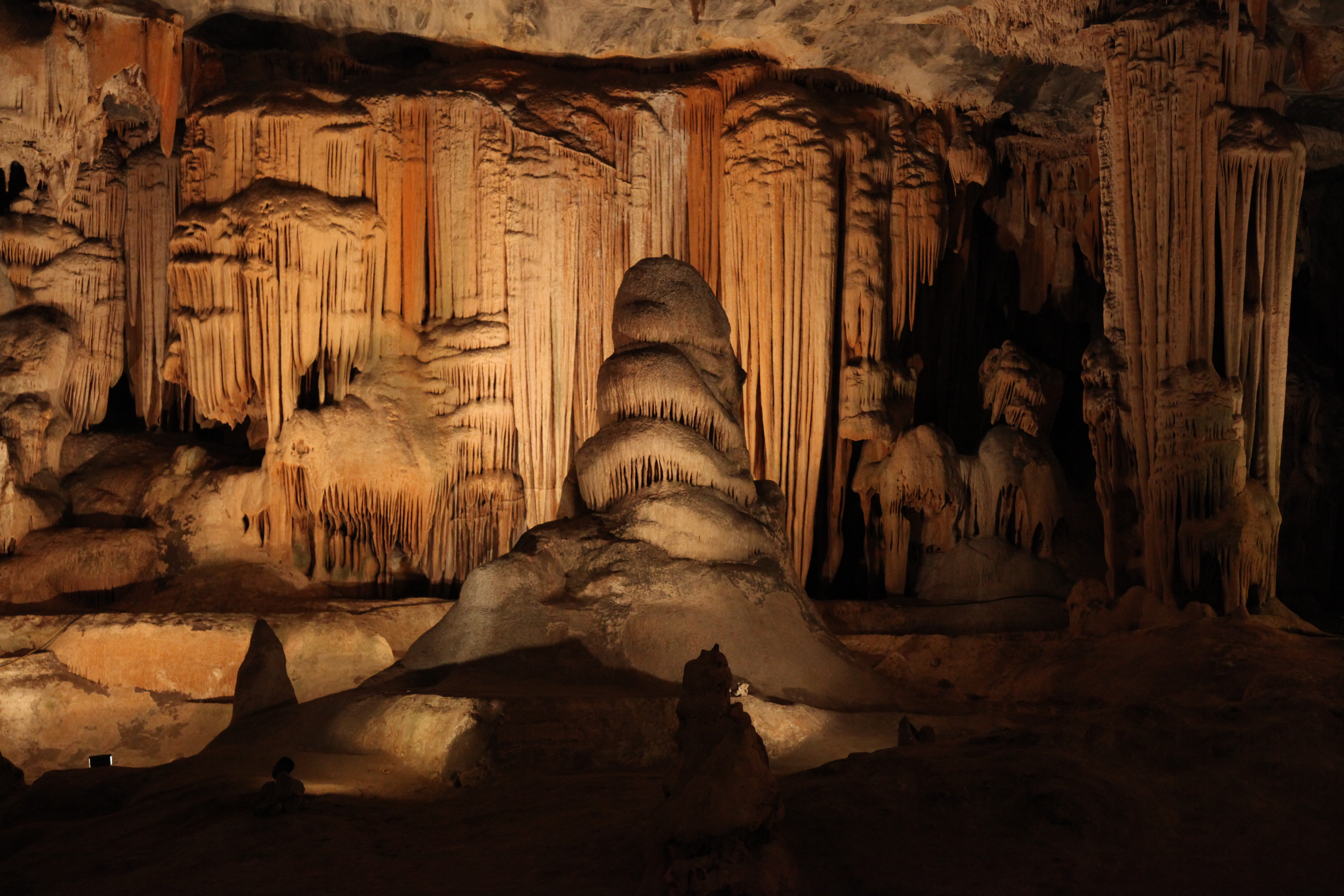
- Speleothems in the caves

- location in South Africa
- 33°23′34″S 22°12′53″E
- Location: foothills of the Swartberg, near Oudtshoorn
- Region: South Africa

Site notes
- Material: Precambrian limestone
- Excavation dates: 1930
- Archaeologists: A.J.H. Goodwin

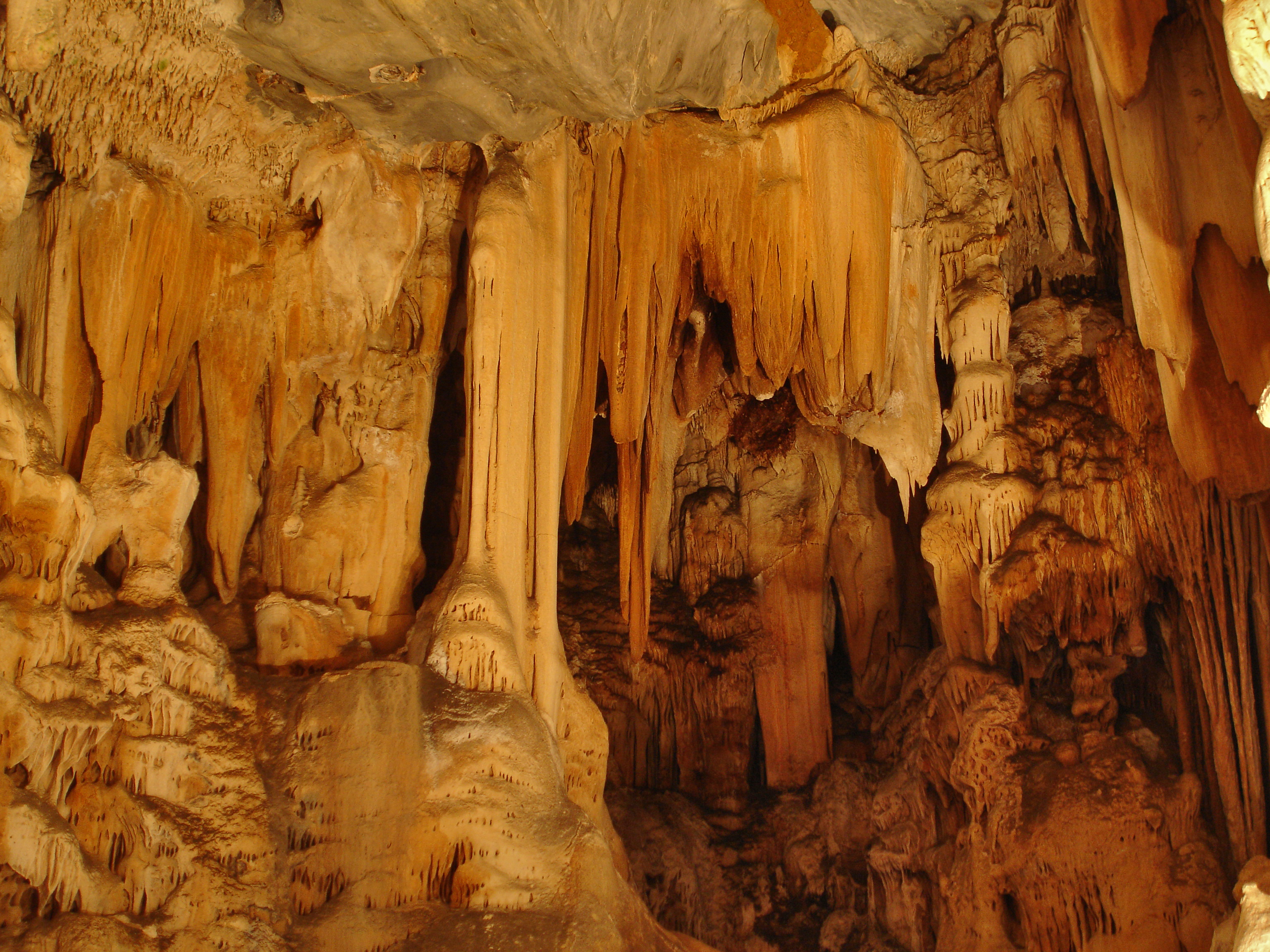
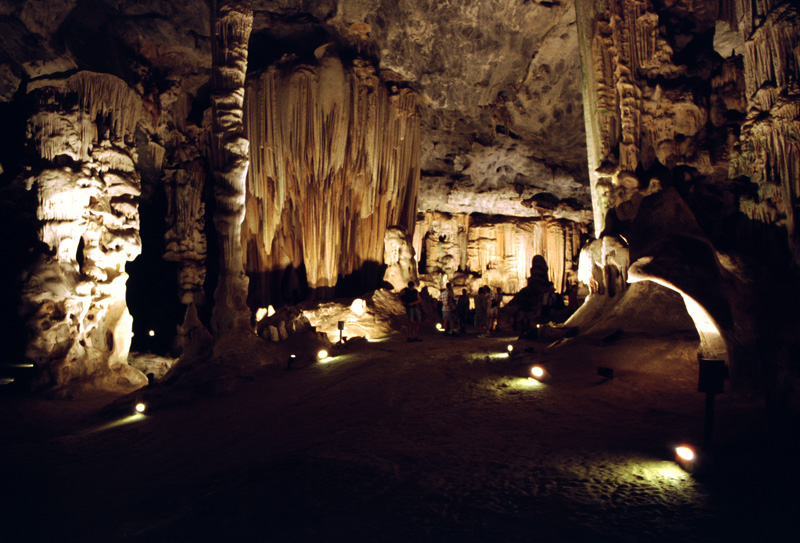
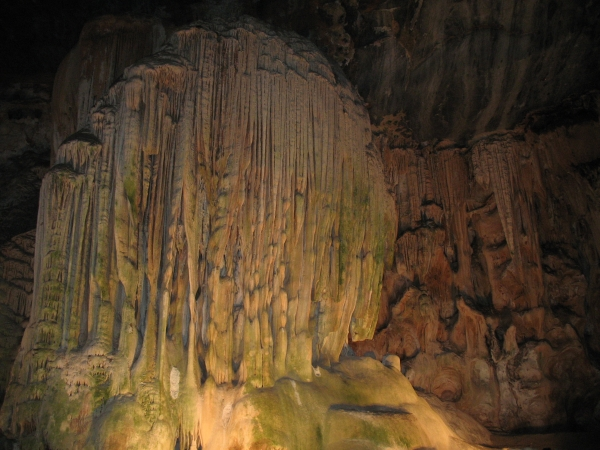

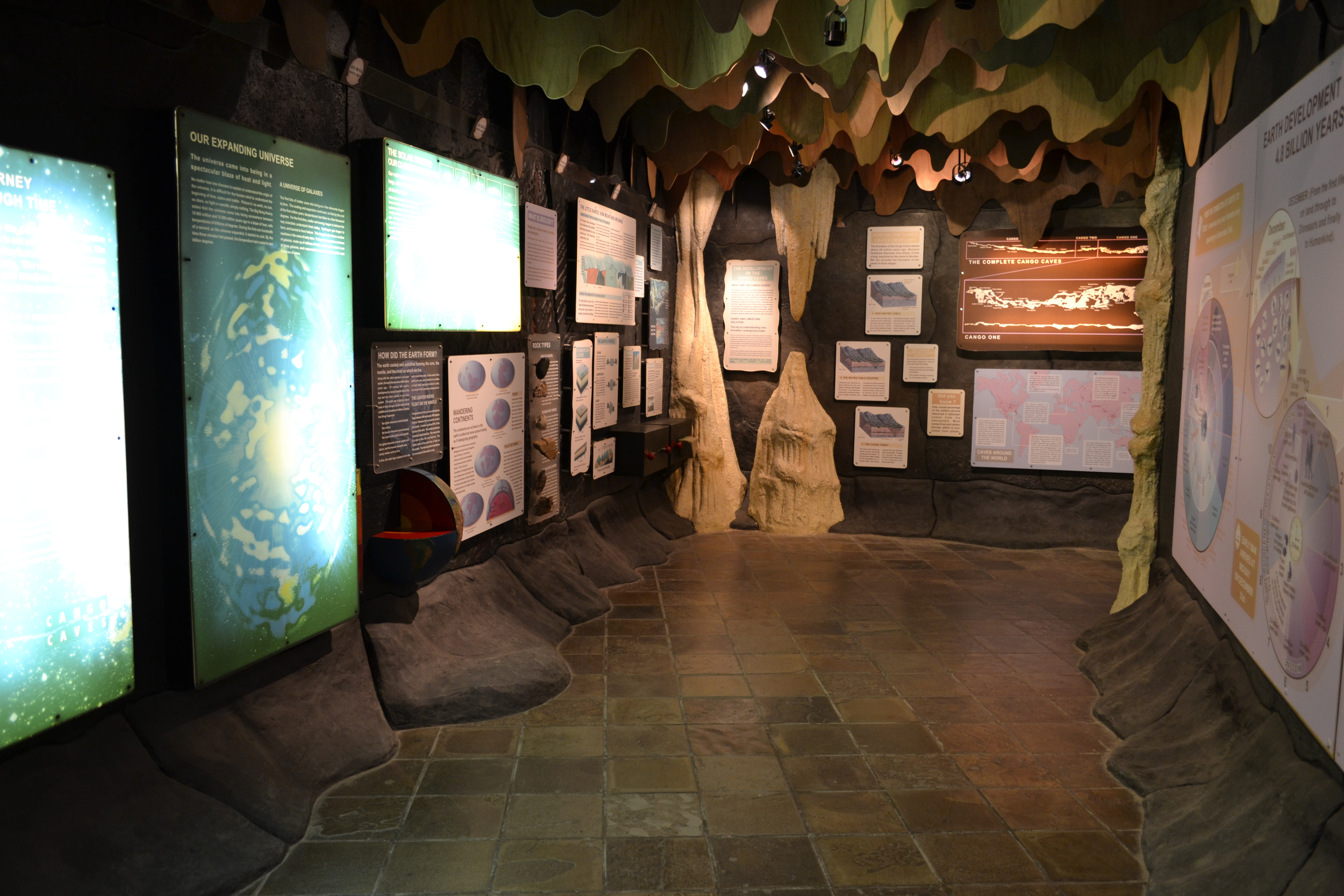
Visitor's centre

The Cango Caves are located in Precambrian limestones at the foothills of the Swartberg range near the town of Oudtshoorn, in the Western Cape Province of South Africa. The principal cave is one of the country's finest, best known, and most popular tourist caves and attracts many visitors from overseas. Although the extensive system of tunnels and chambers go on for over 4 km (2 1/2 mi), only about a quarter of this is open to visitors, who may proceed into the cave only in groups supervised by a guide.

== History ==
Cave paintings and artifacts indicate that the caves were in use throughout prehistory over a long period during the Middle and Later Stone Ages.

The caves were rediscovered in modern times in 1780 by a local farmer named Jacobus Van Zyl. The chamber he first was lowered down into was found to be as long as a football field, and is named Van Zyl Hall in his honor. Further exploration was done and a second chamber discovered in 1792. The caves soon became a popular place to visit.

In 1829 Dr Andrew Smith visited the Cango Caves, which contained much to tempt his scientific curiosity.

A.J.H. Goodwin, an archaeologist at the University of Cape Town, carried out a test excavation in the Cango Caves in 1930 which found stone artefacts and other cultural material.

The Cango Caves Ordinance of 1999 gave certain legal powers over the caves to what was then the Administrator of the Cape; legally, these same powers now devolve to the local government members of the executive. However, day-to-day management of the caves is the responsibility of the municipality of Oudtshoorn.

=== Legends of the caves ===
Mr. Johnny van Wassenaer, the cave’s first official guide is purported to have walked 29 hours to find the end of the caves in 1898. When there, he is said to have calculated that he was 25 km (15 1/2 mi) from the entrance, and 275 m (902 ft) underground; his route apparently followed an underground river. So far, explorers are finding more and more caves to support this story.

== Surveys and explorations ==
The first rough survey was done in 1897, mapping out the first 26 chambers. In 1956 the South African Spelaeological Association was tasked to draw up an accurate mapping of the Cango Caves, and look for alternative entrances.

Their results indicated that the caves were 775 m (2,543 ft) long in a single line, and that they never rise nor fell more than 16 m (52 ft). These were called Cango I. The nearest point to the surface in the caves is at the top of the shaft in the Devil's Kitchen, 52.6 m (173 ft) from the floor.

In 1972 James Craig-Smith, Luther Terblanche and Dart Ruiters widened an obstructed passage to discover Cango II. It stretches 270 m (890 ft) beyond the end of the Devil’s Kitchen. At the end of Cango II there is a shaft that descends 20 m (66 ft) to a chamber filled with water. This water flowed in the direction of Cango I.

In August 1975, during a symposium on cave biology, an exploration team led by Hans Oosthuizen, Luther Terblanche, Michale Schultz, Digby Ellis, Jean Paul Matisse, Bob Mann, Florus Koper and Peter Breedt drained the chamber of most of its water and crawled through what was previously an underwater passage. This led to the discovery of more caves, called Cango III. Altogether these caves are about 1,000 m (3,300 ft) long. The biggest of the chambers, stretches about 300 m (980 ft).

Digby Ellis and Dave Land added 290 m (950 ft) to Cango III when they discovered a crawlway in December 1977. A further 90 m (300 ft) was added in June 1978. All these extensions were surveyed in August 1978 by Dave Land, Charles Maxwell, Brian Russell and Dave Crombie.

== Tourism ==
Tours are conducted at regular intervals on most days—there is a "Standard Tour" which takes an hour and an "Adventure Tour" which takes an hour and a half. The "Adventure Tour" consists of crawling through narrow passages and climbing up steep rock formations guided by small lights. The caves contain halls and limestone formations (on both tours) as well as small passages on the Adventure Tour. The smallest passage that tourists will have to pass through on the Adventure Tour is just under 15 cm to exit. Visiting the caves are considered to be part of exploring the scenic Route 62.

The Cinema Museum in London holds film of a visit to the caves in the 1930s.
