= Cornelis Jacobus Langenhoven =

South African poet who wrote Die Stem (1873–1932)

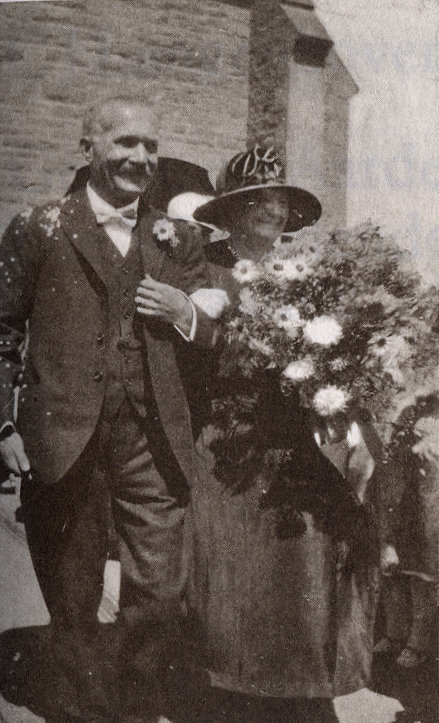
- Langenhoven with his wife at the church in Oudtshoorn on the wedding day of their daughter in 1926
- Born: 13 August 1873; Hoeko, Ladismith, Cape Colony
- Died: 15 July 1932 (aged 58); Oudtshoorn, South Africa
- Resting place: Arbeidsgenot, Oudtshoorn
- Spouse: Lenie van Velden
- Children: Engela (b. 1901)
- Writing career
- Language: Afrikaans
- Notable works: "Die Stem van Suid-Afrika", Versamelde Werke (Collected Works)

Cornelis Jacobus Langenhoven (13 August 1873 – 15 July 1932), who published under his initials C.J. Langenhoven, was a South African poet who played a major role in the development of Afrikaans literature and cultural history. His poetry was one of the then young language's foremost promoters. He is best known for writing the words for "Die Stem van Suid-Afrika", which was used previously as the national anthem during apartheid. He was affectionately known as Sagmoedige Neelsie (Gentle Neelsie) or Kerneels. His childhood friend who helped him get into poetry was called Hans Conrodius van Zyl.

== Biography ==
Langenhoven was born at Hoeko, near Ladismith, in the then Cape Colony, and later moved to Oudtshoorn where he became its most famous resident. In 1897 he married the widow Lenie van Velden. They had one child, a daughter named Engela, who was born in 1901. By 1914 he became a member of parliament (first as member of The House of Assembly, and later as Senator) where he took to the next level the struggle to have Afrikaans officially recognised. He was also a founding member of the Afrikaans newspaper Die Burger, and a South African Freemason.

His most famous work is the former South African national anthem "Die Stem", which he wrote in 1918. Parts of it have been incorporated into the current national anthem, used since the abolition of apartheid in the 1990s. To celebrate the centenary of his birth, in 1973 the South African Post Office issued a series of stamps (in 4-cent, 5-cent and 15-cent denominations).

Langenhoven's writing career spanned almost every genre, from poetry to ghost and alien stories. He also translated several works into Afrikaans, amongst which was the Rubaiyat of Omar Khayyam. He was instrumental in the movement for the acceptance of Afrikaans as a language, and for it to be taught as the first language in schools instead of Dutch. This culminated in the language officially being used in parliament in 1925, and by 1927 it was recognised as an official language of South Africa, together with English and Dutch, although it effectively replaced Dutch in general usage.

== Personality ==
Considered one of the most versatile writers in Afrikaans, he was a master of the short form of prose and is best remembered for his humorous and satirical works, illustrated by a nonsense-verse "love poem" he wrote for his dog. Langenhoven was well known for his sharp wit and gentle manner. He owned an imaginary elephant named Herrie ("Harry") that appeared in many of his stories. He even carved its name onto a boulder next to the N12 highway near Meiringspoort (outside Oudtshoorn) in 1929. This boulder, known as Herrie's Stone ("Herrie se Klip", in Afrikaans), has been declared a provincial heritage site.

== Legacy ==
- The Stellenbosch University Student Center is named after him and is affectionately known as "Die Neelsie" ("The Neelsie").
- South African filmmaker Manie van Rensburg made a light-hearted comedic television series based on Langenhoven's work in 1983, titled Sagmoedige Neelsie.
- To celebrate the centenary of his birth, the South African Post Office issued C.J. Langenhoven stamps in 1973.
- A suburb in the west of Bloemfontein called Langenhoven Park was named after him.
- In 1936, Langenhoven High School was named after him.
- Langenhoven is regarded as one of the most prolific and most versatile Afrikaans writers still today, his Collected Works comprising 16 volumes. He is also fondly remembered and referred to for his quirky personality.
- The place he and his family lived in, called the Arbeidsgenot, (meaning "the pleasure of work" or "the joy of labour") has been turned into a house museum. They lived there from 1901 until 1950.
- Nelson Mandela recounts that in 1964 while in prison he read a book by Langenhoven called Shadows of Nazareth about the trial of Jesus Christ that deeply affected him. Mandela describes how in Langenhoven's book Pilate agreed to judge Jesus, then offered the public a choice that freed not Jesus but the zealot Barabbas, and then how he, Pilate, finally ordered Jesus brought into the Roman court. "He gazed upwards and his eyes seemed to pierce through the roof and to see right beyond the stars," wrote Langenhoven. "It became clear that in that courtroom authority was not in me as a judge, but was down below in the dock where the prisoner was."
