= Oudtshoorn =

- Town
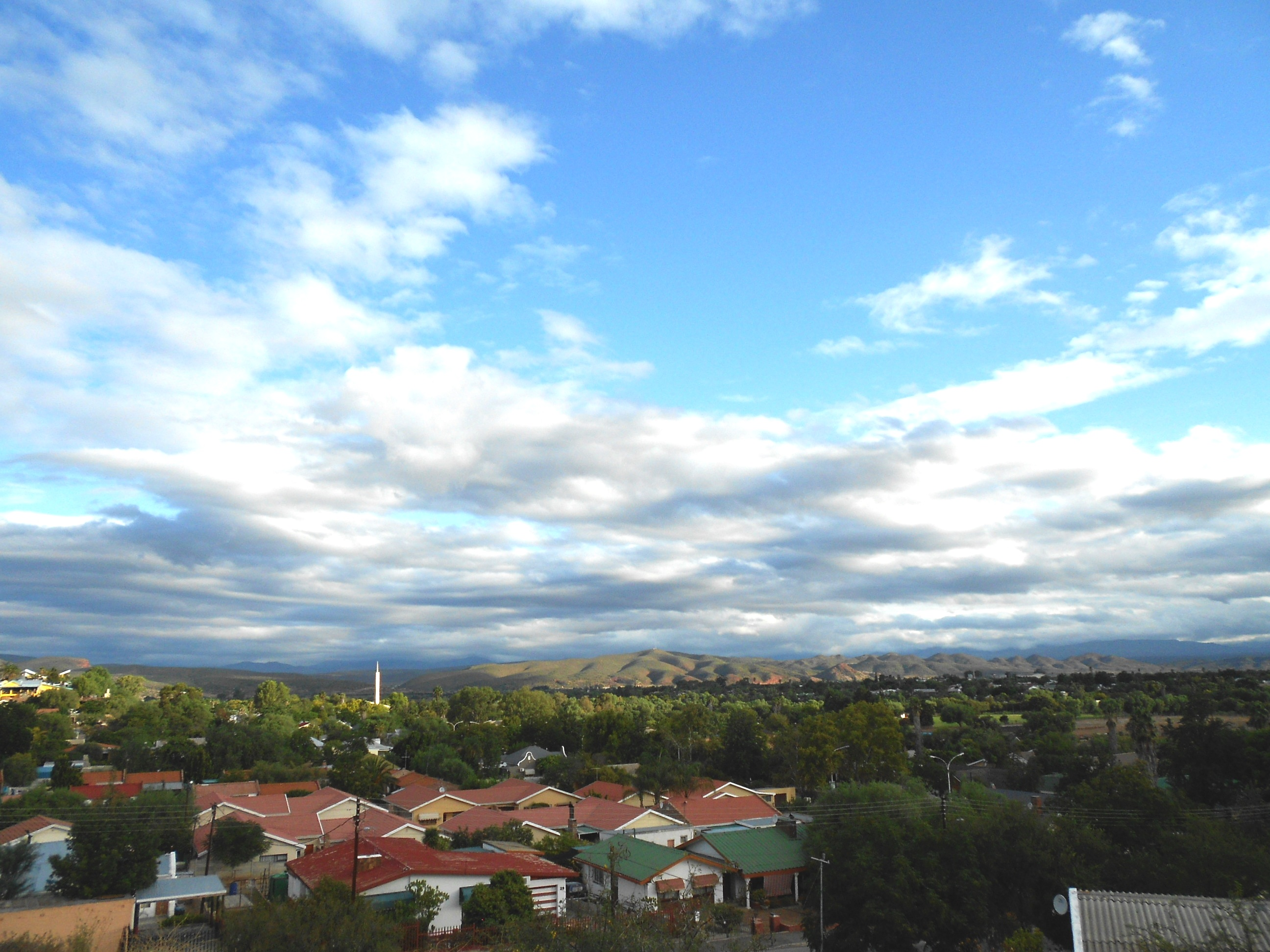
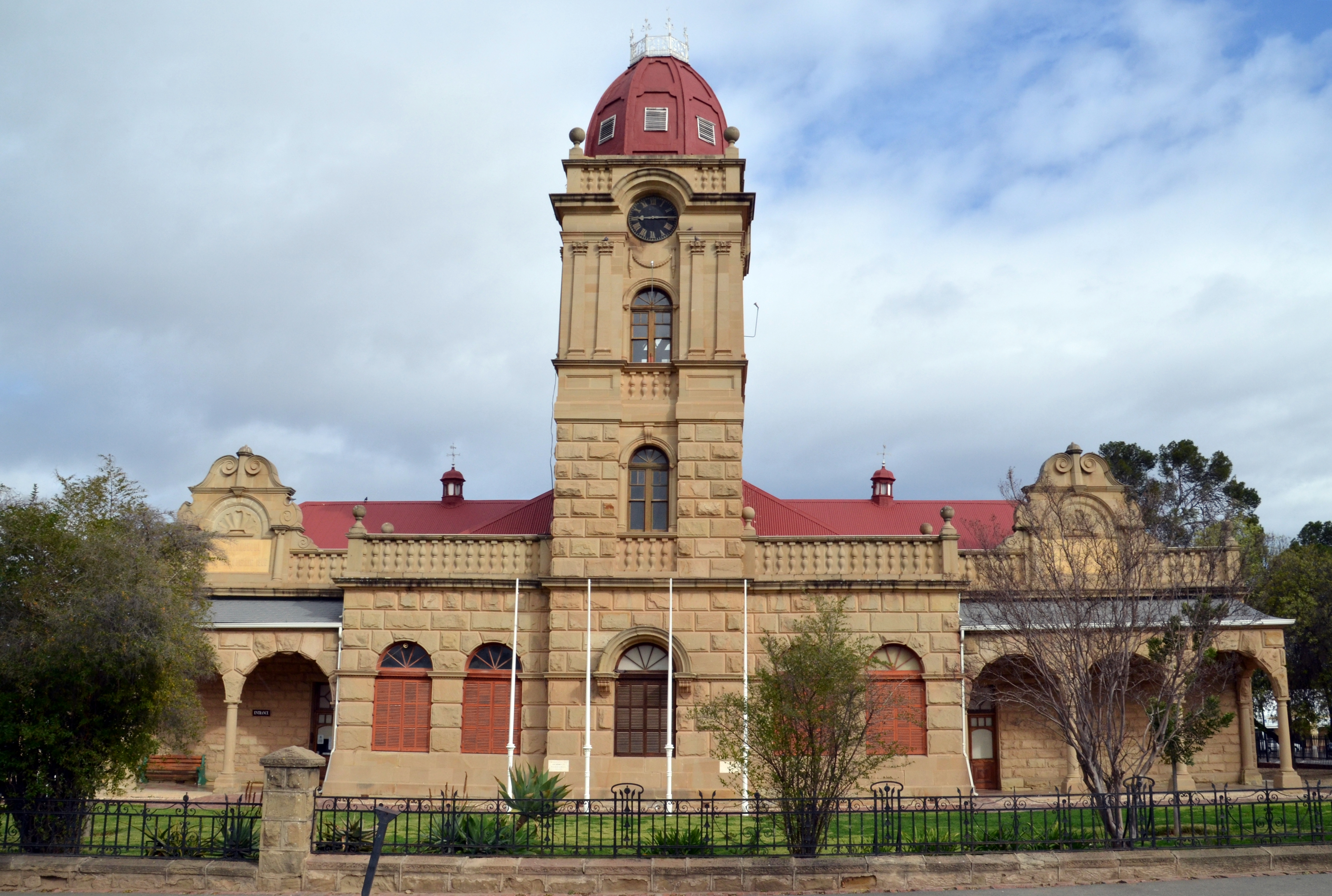
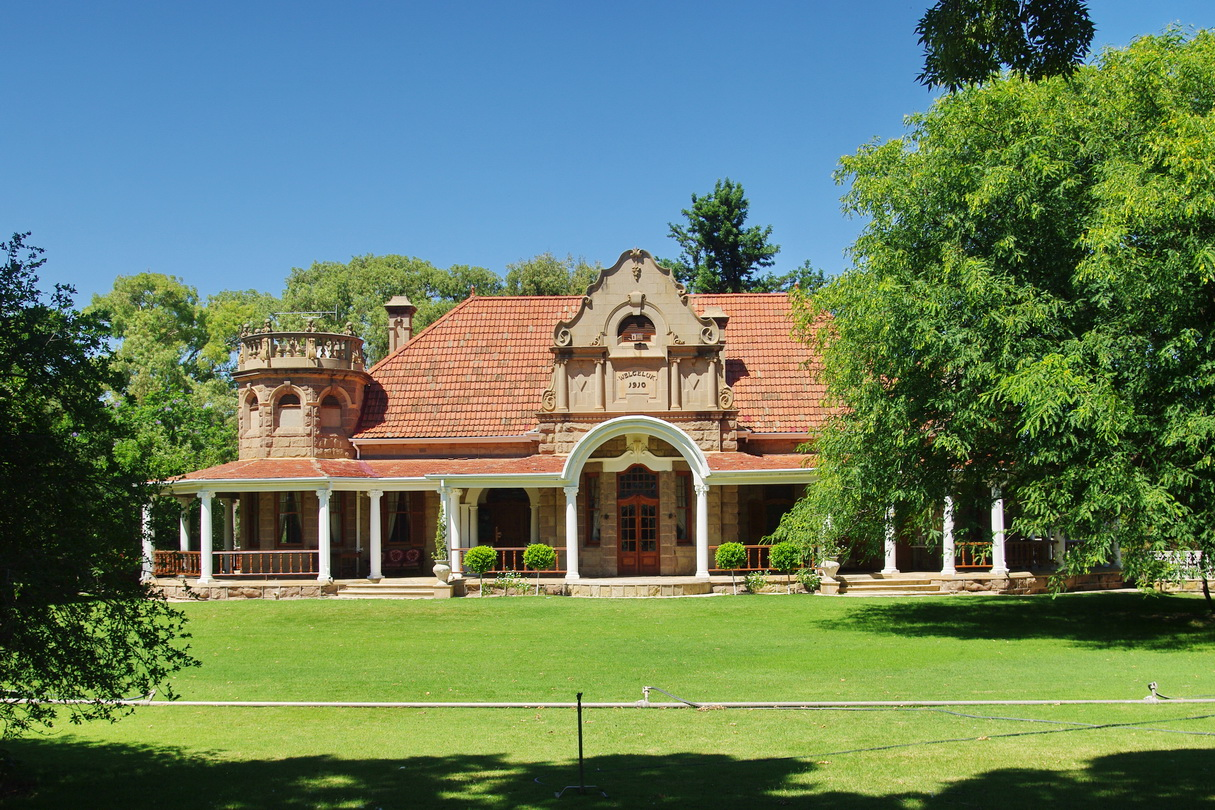
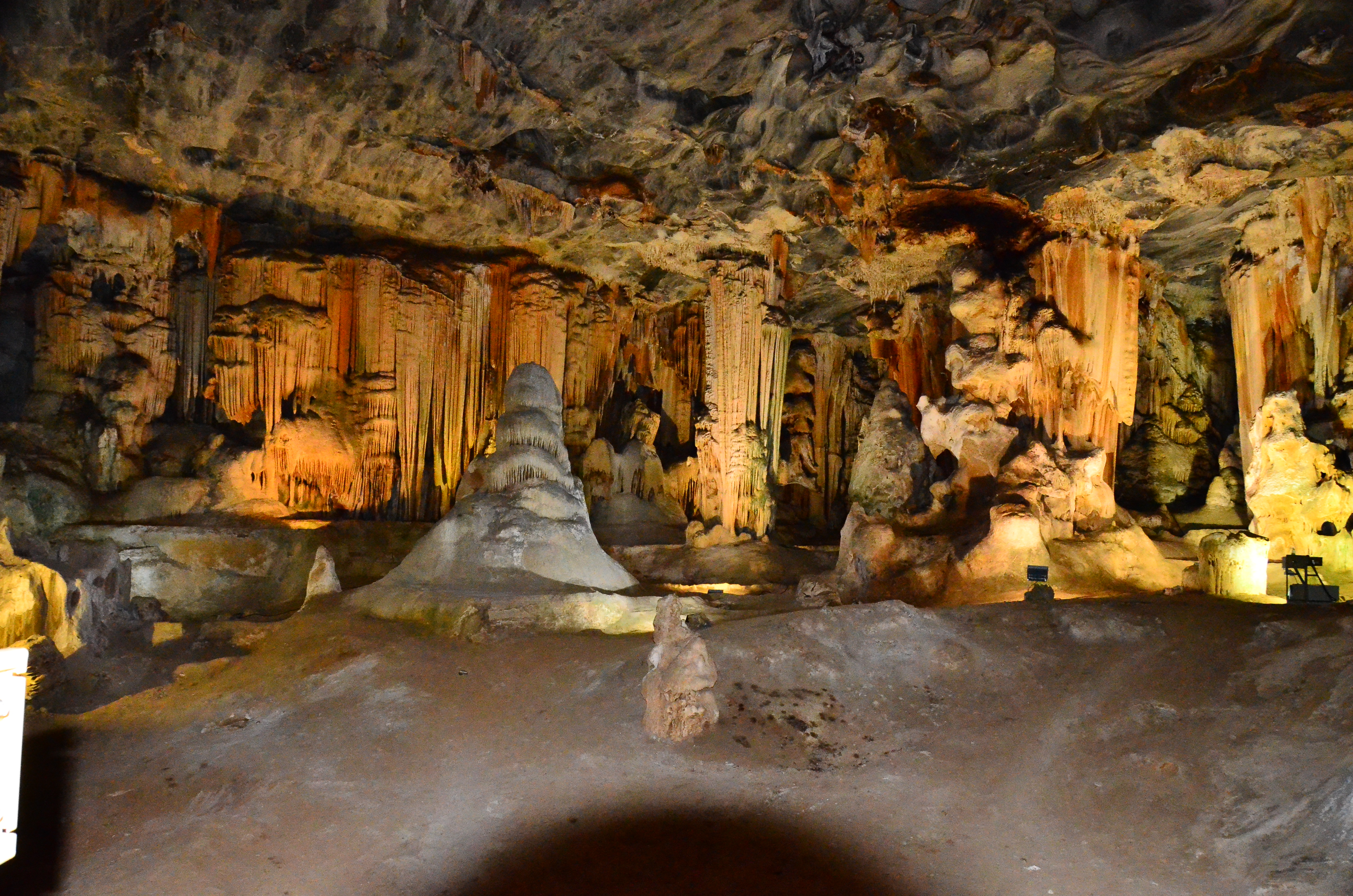
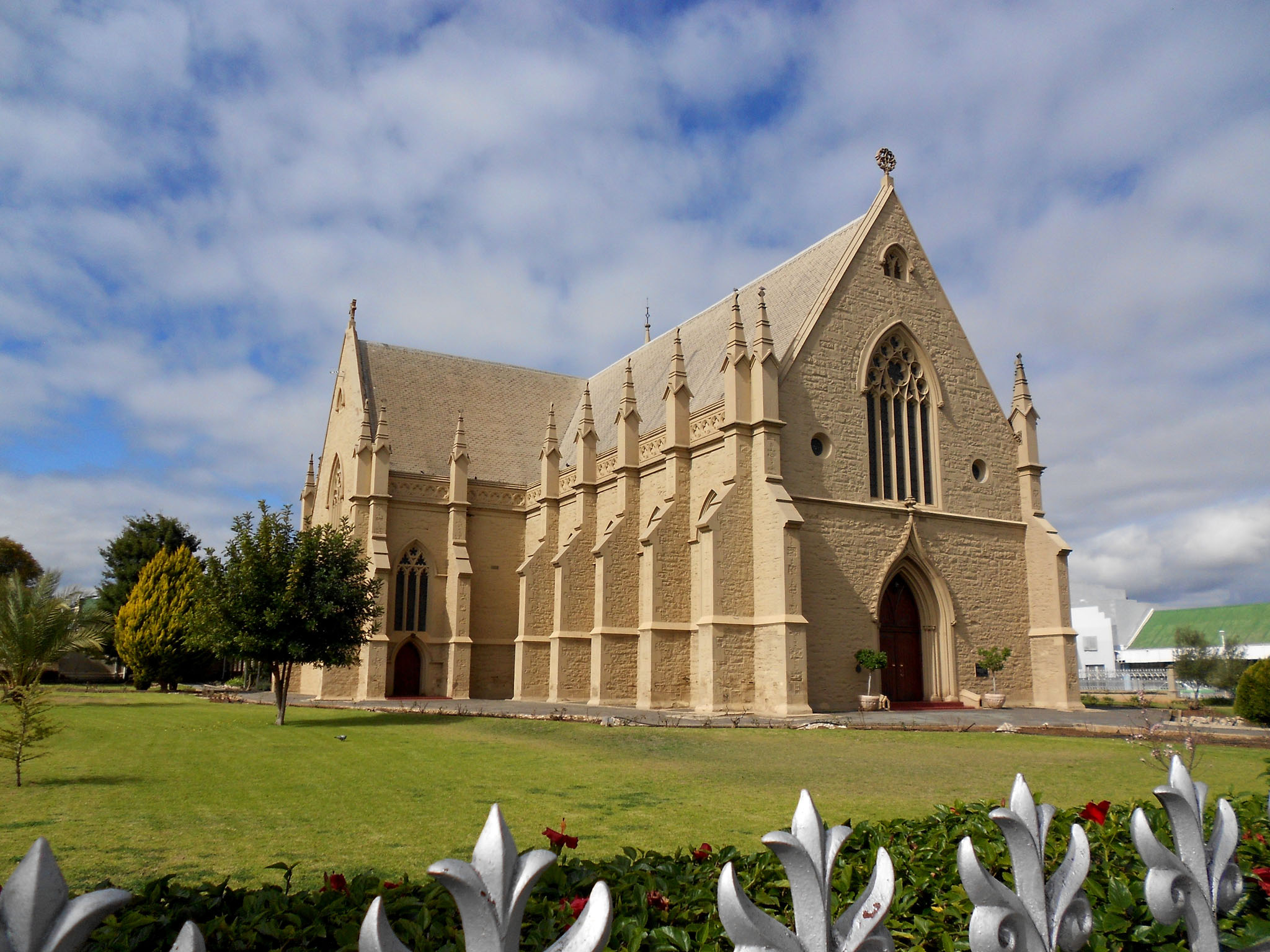
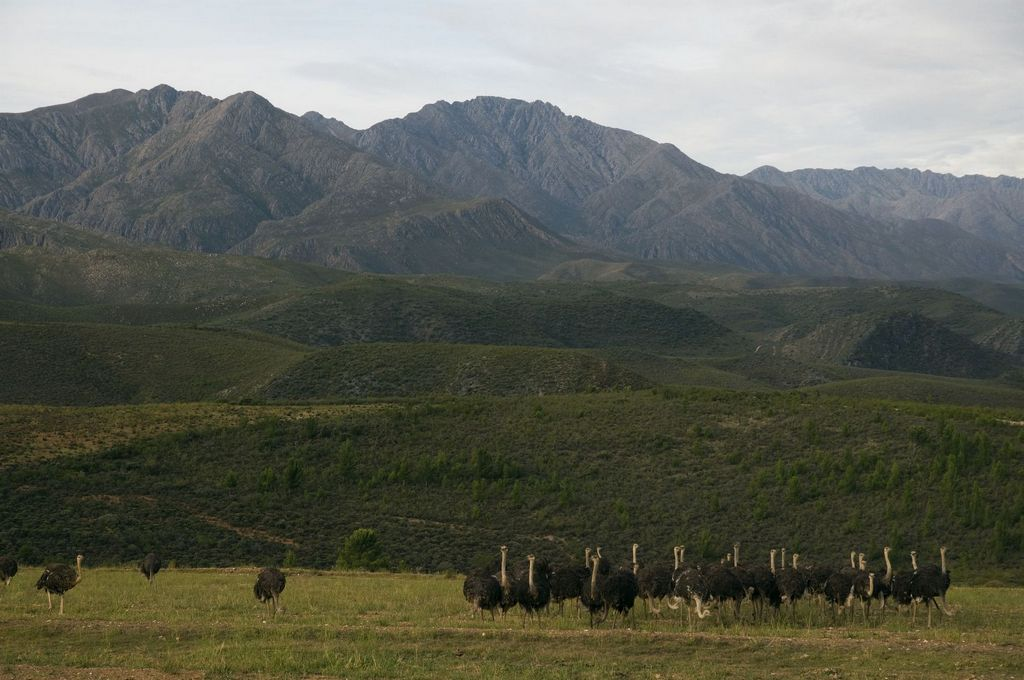
- Clockwise from top: View of Oudtshoorn, Welgeluk Ostrich Palace, Ostrich farms, NG Church, Cango Caves, CP Nel Museum
- Nickname: Ostrich Capital of the World
- Location within Western Cape Location within South Africa Location within Africa
- Coordinates: 33°35′S 22°12′E
- Country: South Africa
- Province: Western Cape
- District: Garden Route
- Municipality: Oudtshoorn
- Established: 1857

Government
  - Councillor: James du Preez (DA)

Area
  - Total: 37.6 km^{2} (14.5 sq mi)

Population (2011)
  - Total: 61,507
  - Density: 1,640/km^{2} (4,240/sq mi)

Racial makeup (2011)
  - Black African: 12.5%
  - Coloured: 70.9%
  - Indian/Asian: 0.4%
  - White: 15.3%
  - Other: 1.0%

First languages (2011)
  - Afrikaans: 87.8%
  - Xhosa: 7.4%
  - English: 2.6%
  - Other: 2.2%
- Time zone: UTC+2 (SAST)
- Postal code (street): 6625
- PO box: 6620
- Area code: 044

Oudtshoorn (/ˈaʊtshɔːrn/, Afrikaans pronunciation: [ˈœutsˌɦuərən]) is a town in the Western Cape province of South Africa, located between the Swartberg mountains to the north and the Outeniqua Mountains to the south. Dubbed the "ostrich capital of the world", Oudtshoorn is known for its ostrich-feather booms, during 1865–1870 and 1900–1914. With approximately 60,000 inhabitants, it is the largest town in the Klein Karoo region. The town's economy is primarily reliant on the ostrich farming and tourism industries. Oudtshoorn is home to the world's largest ostrich population, with a number of specialised ostrich breeding farms, such as the Safari Show Farm and the Highgate Ostrich Show Farm, as stated by Pierre D. Toit.

Bhongolethu is a township 10 km (6 mi) east of Oudtshoorn. Derived from Xhosa, its name means "our pride".

== History ==
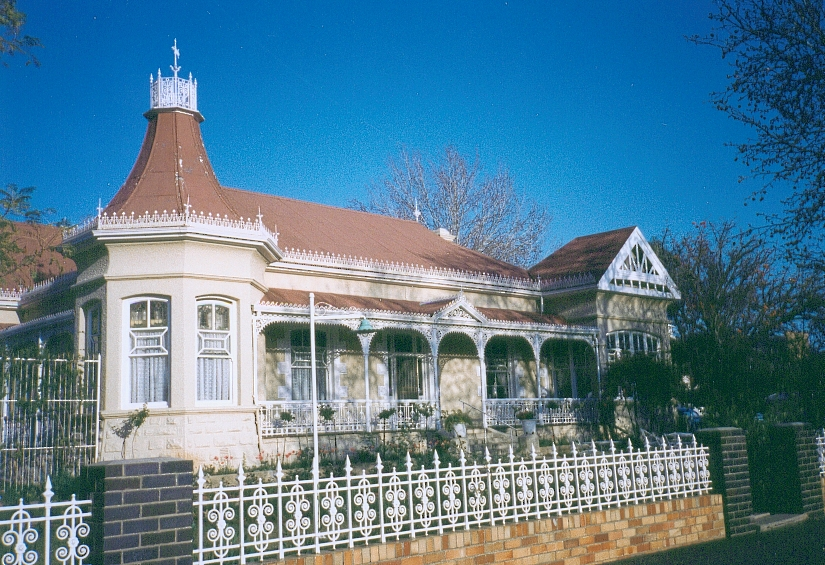
A historical building in the town

=== Settlement ===
The pioneer farmers in the area that would be known as Oudtshoorn arrived in the 1750s, and became well-established in the area by the end of the 18th century. In addition to rearing livestock, they cultivated wheat and barley, made wine and brandy, and grew tobacco as well as a variety of soft fruit. As market opportunities in neighbouring districts such as George and Mossel Bay developed, the economic benefit of mixed farming came to be understood and utilized.

Initially, the pioneer farmers in the area fell under the administrative and legal sphere of Swellendam, but in fact George was the closest that inhabitants had to government headquarters. By the 1820s, the increasing population along the Olifants River and in the valleys of its tributaries increased the need for more local administrative and especially judicial supervision; especially the 1809 Hottentot Proclamation increased the legal and administrative burdens on slave owners. For these reasons, with its founding in April 1811, the magisterial district of George subsumed Oudtshoorn.

In the 1810s, due to the obstacles south and west of the area, trade contacts with developing towns to the east and north of Oudtshoorn unfolded instead. By the 1830s, the settlers' subsistence farming had transformed into a market economy, laying the foundation for further socio-economic development.

=== Founding ===
Farmer Cornelis P. Rademeyer was persuaded by residents in 1838 to make some of his farmland along the Hartebees River available for the construction of the first church in the area. On Sunday, 3 November 1839, the new Dutch Reformed church was inaugurated. For the next 40 years, it formed the center of congregational life in the area. Oudtshoorn gradually grew around this church. During September 1847, following the "urgent wishes of [his] neighbors", C.P. Rademeyer requested permission from the Cape government to turn his farm, Hartebees River, into a town, which he would name after Baron Pieter van Rheede van Oudtshoorn.

On 12 August 1847, it was announced in the Government Gazette that a number of wet and dry plots from the Hartebees River would be auctioned on 15 November of that year. The terms of sale stipulated that each plot owner or resident could use 1/500 of the water in the Grobbelaars River, and reserved certain preferential rights in this respect for the original owners.

However, the title deed issued to Rademeyer on 8 March 1832 had included the following servitude: "irrigation shall be effected by the river called Grobbelaars River." This servitude effectively excluded the entire would-be town from the use of the river's water. Rademeyer successfully applied to the government to have the servitude struck. Civil commissioner Aspeling van George recommended that the original servitude be amended so that water from the river could be led across the farm Grobbelaars River to Hartebees River for irrigation purposes.

In 1848, Oudtshoorn was officially founded.

=== Development ===
The founding of Oudtshoorn provided a central service area situated between the Swart and Outeniqua mountains, and by the time that the first resident magistrate, Colonel A.B. Armstrong, arrived in 1855, the settlement had spread over a mile and a half.

It was not until December 1847 that a Thomas Harris started the first state-supported "Farmers' School" next to the Grobbelaars River. Prior to that, even the most prosperous inhabitants employed private tutors, the use of which was forced upon them by the poor state of the roads in the region at the time, the costs of accommodation, as well as the continuing lack of farm workers. Private tutors solved the problem of transport and accommodation, and allowed the children to continue to help with farm work.

In 1853, the Dutch Reformed church was officially established as a kerkplaats (church farm).

Oudtshoorn was proclaimed as its own, separate magisterial district in 1858. In that same year, the first British settlers settled in the area.

The settlement's growth was constrained by the limited supply of water in the area. In the early years, water was transported to the town in barrels, which were sold for sixpence per bucket. Forced to cope with the lack of water, many of South Africa's earliest irrigation experts hailed from the region. The local economy came to be based primarily upon tobacco and ostrich farming. A severe drought in 1865 persuaded many of the settlers to move to the Transvaal. The 1865 census indicated that Oudtshoorn had a population of 1,145.

=== Ostrich farming ===
==== First Ostrich Boom ====
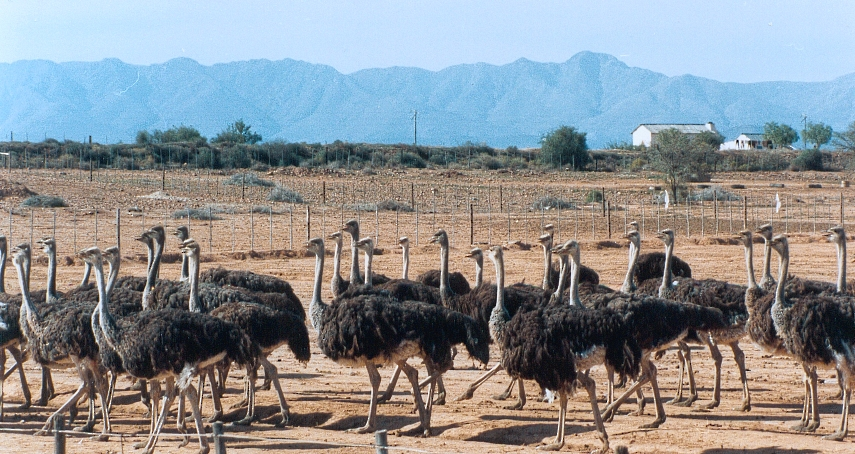
The Highgate Ostrich Show Farm

Oudtshoorn's ostrich industry dates back to 1864. The main reason for the surge in Oudtshoorn's prosperity was the ostrich, whose feathers had become fashionable accessories among European nobility. Feather exports saw a sharp increase from the Cape Colony during the mid-1860s, which is generally accepted as the launch of the industry in South Africa. By 1870, feather auctions were being held in Mossel Bay. In 1875, the census counted the town's population to be 1,837. Between 1875 and 1880, ostrich prices reached up to GBP 1,000 a pair. The value of ostrich feathers, per pound, equaled almost that of diamonds. The farmers of the region, realising that ostriches were far more profitable than any other activity, ripped out their other crops and planted lucerne, which was used as feed for the ostriches. By 1877, feather auctions were also being held in Oudtshoorn itself. The rising wealth also finally allowed for the completion of the Dutch Reformed Church, which was opened on 7 June 1879. Such was the worth of the white ostrich feather, that it was dubbed "white gold".

Owing to overproduction, the ostrich industry experienced a sudden slump in fortunes in 1885; the town's misery was compounded when it was hit by severe flooding during the same year, which washed away the nearby Victoria Bridge, which had been built over the Olifants River only the year before.

The boom had attracted a large Jewish immigrant population of about 100 families, most of them Lithuanians from the towns of Kelme and Shavel, who were fleeing from the Tsarist pogroms. As a result, Oudtshoorn came to be known as "the Jerusalem of Africa". Two synagogues were built, the first in 1888 and the second in 1896, and the first South African Hebrew school was established in Oudtshoorn in 1904. In 1891, Oudtshoorn's population had grown to 4,386 persons.

==== Second Ostrich Boom ====
The ostrich industry recovered slowly, owing in part to the Second Anglo-Boer War of 1899 to 1902. Boer forces under Commandant Gideon Scheepers were sighted near Oudtshoorn on 25 August 1901, but moved on because the town was well defended. A second and bigger boom started after the war. It was during this period that "feather barons", ostrich farmers who had become rich, built most of Oudtshoorn's famously opulent "feather palaces", their houses, most of them on the west bank of the Grobbelaars River. The town grew even more, and in 1904 it claimed 8,849 residents in the census. This boom peaked in 1913, during which year the highest-quality feathers cost more than $32 a pound in 2012 prices. Ostrich feathers were outranked only by gold, diamonds and wool among South African exports before World War I. The market collapsed in 1914, according to The Chicago Tribune, as a result of "the start of World War I, overproduction and the popularity of open-topped cars, which made ostrich-feather hats impractical." 80% of the ostrich farmers were bankrupted, and the ostriches were set loose or slaughtered for biltong. Domesticated ostriches numbered 314,000 at the end of World War I, but had plummeted to 32,000 by 1930. The Jewish population of Oudtshoorn fell from 1,073 in 1918 to 555 in 1936, and only continued to dwindle.

For 40 years, Oudtshoorn had been the most important settlement east of Cape Town.

The successful agriculture pursuits in the area necessitated an extensive and economically significant train system, which was developed in the 1930s. Despite the periodic irreparability of the Cradock Pass and Attakwaskloof in the Outeniqua Mountains, a reputable trade developed between the inhabitants north and south of the range. There was also trade with Cape Town, but its scope is uncertain; in any case, the poor state of the passes Attakwaskloof and Caledonkloof, through the transverse mountains on either side of the Gamka River, had a disruptive effect on trade with Cape Town.

=== Recent history ===
During World War II, 500 Polish orphans along with 38 Polish childcare workers were admitted in Oudtshoorn in 1943 (see Poland–South Africa relations). Two Polish elementary schools were established there, for boys and girls, respectively, and the Polish newspaper Krzyż Południa ("Cross of the South") was issued there.

The end of World War II opened new markets for ostrich leather and meat, and as a result the industry eventually recovered.

In the 1940s, two justices of the peace, Ludolph Niepoth Jr. and John O'Connell, were appointed for the Olifants and Grobbelaars rivers, respectively. However, this only relieved the most pressing judicial concerns, and the government was consequently forced to create a local government authority.

The production of specialised agricultural seed is the biggest contributor to the region's wealth today, but ostrich farming remains an important business.

==== Bird flu ====
Through late 2004 to late 2005, South Africa lost R700 million in exports as a result of an avian flu outbreak, which also cost the ostrich industry 26,000 birds and 400 employees. The business arm of the ostrich industry, the Klein Karoo Group, stated that the recent ban on exports resulted in an increase of about 500% in local sales. Most ostrich farms recovered from the outbreak and continued to operate.

In April, 2011, a strain of bird flu, H5N2, broke out in Oudtshoorn. As a member of the World Organisation for Animal Health, South Africa was required under international law to slaughter infected birds that belonged to farms which had tested positive for bird flu; as a result 38,000 ostriches were culled. The European Union, which had been responsible for 90% of South Africa's ostrich meat exports, banned the import of South African ostrich meat. This resulted in financial difficulties for the region's ostrich farms. Farmers were offered financial compensation by the government in the form of R2,000 for each ostrich culled (about 80% of its worth) but this compensation was not enough; they were forced to fire employees, whose UIF (unemployment) benefits were depleted by December, 2011. The shortage of birds would also affect factories which depended on ostrich farming. Some ostrich farms managed to survive by selling ostrich feathers and leather, but the industry was losing R108 million monthly, and had lost R1,2 billion in total between April, 2011, and January, 2012. Tourism was also affected. Other farmers resorted to heat-treating the ostrich meat, which killed the virus but also reduced its price on the market.

As of January 2012, Oudtshoorn's population of more than 200,000 ostriches was the world's largest, and accounted for 80% of the world's ostrich products. The ostrich industry in the Oudtshoorn region had directly employed 20,000 people, and generated R2,1 billion per year. 50% of ostrich farmers had left the industry by 2013.

The first positive case of a bird flu in South Africa since 2011 was confirmed in April, 2013 on a farm near Oudtshoorn, as the H7N1 virus. Between the H5N2 virus outbreak of 2011 and the H7N1 virus outbreak of 2013, roughly 50,000 ostriches had been culled. The Minister of Agriculture, Forestry and Fisheries, Senzeni Zokwana, said in October, 2014 that the outbreaks "in the past few years" had cost the country R4 billion.

==== Municipal crisis ====
In the years leading up to the 2013 municipal by-elections, Oudtshoorn had been subject to long-standing "acrimonious political battles" and the municipality was also being investigated by a Special Investigating Unit over allegations of malpractice and corruption. On 30 April 2013, Marius Fransman and other African National Congress (ANC) party members were forced to leave Oudtshoorn as a result of a protest against them. Following that incident, the powers of the ANC's sub-regional politicians in Oudtshoorn were suspended, pending an investigation.

The municipal by-elections in August, 2013, resulted in the ANC losing its majority in the municipality of Oudtshoorn. The Democratic Alliance (DA) obtained 12 seats, which, with its alliance partner Congress of the People (COPE), meant that it had secured the municipality for itself. On 1 October 2013, George Kersop on behalf of human rights organisation AfriForum laid charges of corruption, fraud, and financial mismanagement against Ronnie Lottering, the acting Municipal Manager of Oudtshoorn, various officials, and members of the public, with the Hawks, the counter-corruption unit of the South African Police Service (SAPS).

The ANC delayed transfer of municipal power to the DA via legal cases funded through municipal funds, which DA Oudtshoorn caucus leader Christiaan MacPherson stated in July, 2014, had cost R13 million. The provincial leader for the DA, Helen Zille, speculated also that the ANC had been siphoning funds from the Cango Caves trust fund to finance the legal actions. John Stoffels, the Oudtshoorn speaker for the ANC, was ordered to pay the costs of the legal actions brought on behalf of the ANC because he had refused to convene council meetings to avoid motions of no confidence against the ruling party. The ANC began to suspend DA councilors on absenteeism charges. A court order prevented the DA from bringing a motion of no confidence against the ANC, Independent Civic Organisation of South Africa and National Peoples Party executive.

On 10 April 2014, AfriForum indicated that it had requested Helen Zille's intervention in the Oudtshoorn and Kannaland regions due to the "rampant municipal mismanagement". In July, 2014, Western Cape Finance MEC Ivan Meyer, and Local Government MEC Anton Bredell, probed claims that the Cango Caves trust fund was being misused for municipal purposes. It was claimed that more than R16 million had been moved from the accounts, which were intended for maintenance and infrastructure development of the caves.

The ANC and its political allies had yet to hand over control of the municipality to the DA and the COPE by July 2014. The DA, AfriForum, and the Oudtshoorn ratepayers association together filed a request with the Western Cape High Court that DA councillors who had been suspended be reinstated, and that the ANC mayor, speaker and town managers surrender their offices to the DA and COPE.

In October, 2014, Francois Human, Director of Corporate Services for the municipality of Oudtshoorn, compiled allegations against his ANC colleagues, such as incidents of corruption, bribery and intimidation, and forwarded them to political leaders, the South African Revenue Service (SARS), the Special Investigations Unit and the SAPS.

== Climate ==
Climate data for Oudtshoorn
Month	Jan	Feb	Mar	Apr	May	Jun	Jul	Aug	Sep	Oct	Nov	Dec	Year
Mean daily maximum °C (°F)	29 (84)	29 (84)	27 (81)	24 (75)	21 (70)	18 (64)	18 (64)	19 (66)	21 (70)	24 (75)	25 (77)	27 (81)	24 (74)
Daily mean °C (°F)	21.8 (71.2)	21.5 (70.7)	20.2 (68.4)	17.1 (62.8)	14.5 (58.1)	11.5 (52.7)	10.9 (51.6)	11.9 (53.4)	14.1 (57.4)	16.4 (61.5)	17.9 (64.2)	19.9 (67.8)	16.5 (61.7)
Mean daily minimum °C (°F)	16 (61)	16 (61)	15 (59)	12 (54)	9 (48)	7 (45)	6 (43)	6 (43)	8 (46)	11 (52)	12 (54)	14 (57)	11 (52)
Average precipitation mm (inches)	32.6 (1.28)	26.6 (1.05)	31.3 (1.23)	25.5 (1.00)	30.6 (1.20)	33.4 (1.31)	29.9 (1.18)	30.1 (1.19)	27.1 (1.07)	37.8 (1.49)	40.0 (1.57)	26.3 (1.04)	371.2 (14.61)
Average relative humidity (%)	61.8	64.3	66.3	67.3	64.8	64.7	63.7	63.8	65.7	65	63.4	62.3	64.4
Average dew point °C (°F)	14.7 (58.5)	15.3 (59.5)	14.4 (57.9)	11.2 (52.2)	8.2 (46.8)	5.7 (42.3)	5.1 (41.2)	6.1 (43.0)	8.3 (46.9)	10.0 (50.0)	12.2 (54.0)	13.8 (56.8)	10.4 (50.8)
Mean daily daylight hours	14.5	13.7	12.7	12.7	10.8	10.4	10.6	11.4	12.3	13.4	14.3	14.8	12.6
Percentage possible sunshine	70.8	69.6	67.6	64.1	63.4	62.6	68.8	66.5	63.7	63	65.6	69.2	66.2
Average ultraviolet index	5	6	5	4	4	4	4	4	4	4	5	6	5
Source: world weather online(2009-2023) Weatherbase (sunhine-dew point-humidity)

== Demography ==
Historical population

Year	Pop.	±% p.a.
1865	1,145	—
1875	1,837	+4.84%
1891	4,386	+5.59%
1904	8,849	+5.55%
1936	13,229	+1.26%

Year	Pop.	±% p.a.
1991	48,570	+2.39%
1996	52,336	+1.50%
2001	55,205	+1.07%
2011	61,508	+1.09%
2017	67,295	+1.51%

According to the 2011 census, Oudtshoorn had 61,507 inhabitants—17,640 in Bridgeton, 14,724 in Bongolethu and 29,143 in the rest of the town. 70.9% of the population described themselves as "Coloured", 15.3% as "White" and 12.5% as "Black African". The predominant language is Afrikaans, spoken as the home language of 87.8% of inhabitants, while 7.4% speak Xhosa and 2.6% speak English.

In the 1936 Census 6,512 were described as European, 6,411 described as Coloured, 22 as Asiatic, and 284 described as Native or Bantu resulting in a total population of 13,229. This made it the 21st largest settlement in South Africa, a decline of 2 places from the 1911 census when it was recorded as the 19th largest settlement.

== Society and culture ==
=== Afrikaans ===
C. J. Langenhoven, the town's most famous inhabitant, rose to prominence during the post-collapse period. Considered by many to be one of the fathers of Afrikaans, Langenhoven was a prodigious writer who provided much of the literature that formed the backbone of the Afrikaans language during its early development.

=== Festivals ===
The Klein Karoo Nasionale Kunstefees ("Little Karoo National Arts Festival"), better known as the KKNK, is South Africa's largest Afrikaans language arts festival, and takes place in the town on a yearly basis.

=== Museums, monuments and memorials ===
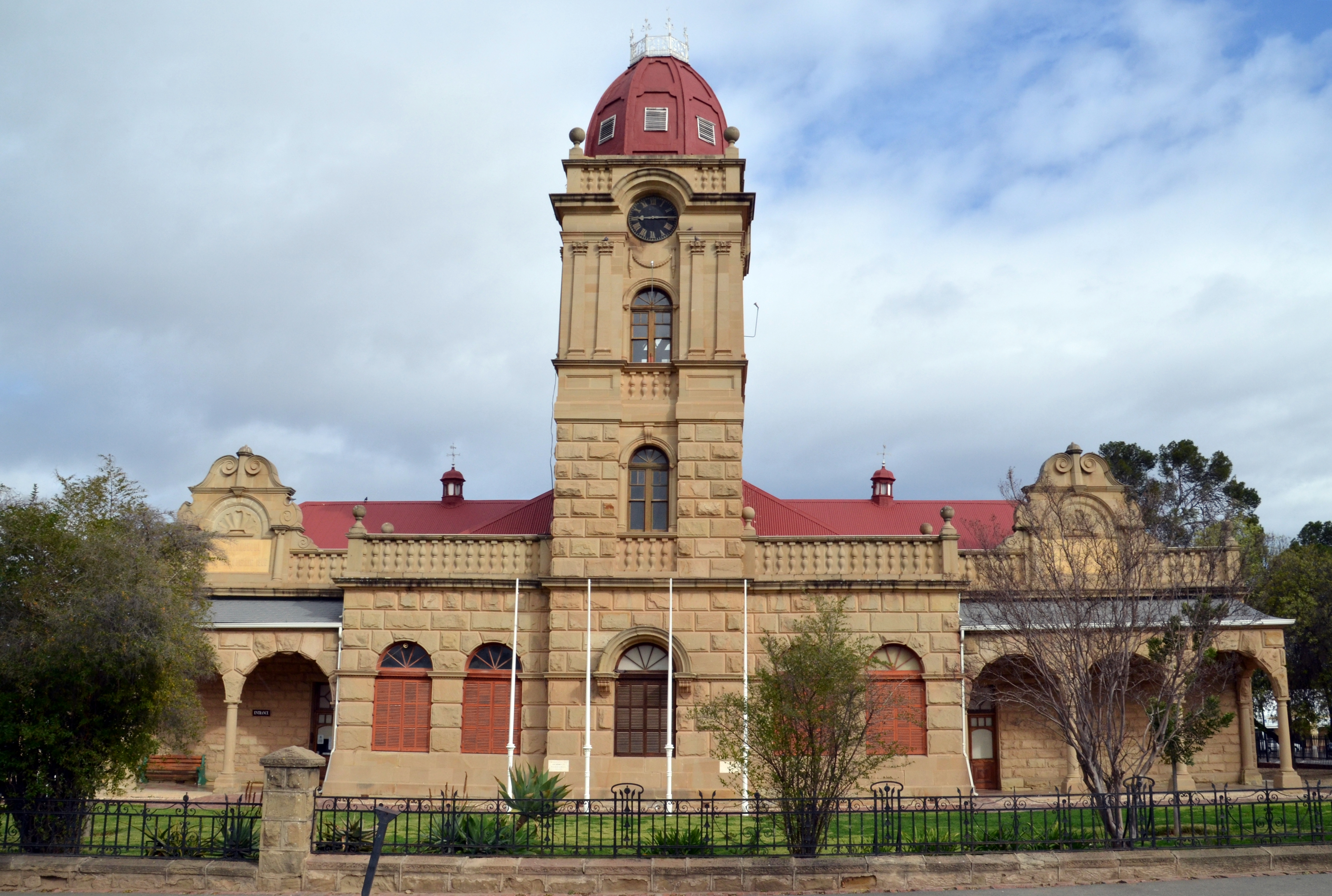
CP Nel Museum

- Arbeidsgenot, 217 Jan van Riebeeck Road
- CP Nel Museum
- Le Roux Town House, 146 High Street

=== Churches ===
The oldest church is the St Jude's Anglican Church, which is situated in Baron van Reede Street. Other churches include, Apostolic Faith Mission, Dutch Reformed Church, Presbyterian, Baptist, Roman Catholic (Roman Catholic Diocese of Oudtshoorn) and other traditional churches. In recent years, the number of independent churches (also referred to as non-denominational churches) have grown. Independent Churches include the Joshua Generation Church, The Vineyard and the Oudtshoorn Community Church.

=== Educational Institutions ===
Apart from the many high schools in Oudtshoorn, there are also independent tertiary educational institutions, including the South Cape College.

=== Military ===
The Oudtshoorn army base houses the South African Infantry School.

The Oudtshoorn airport is the site of 45 Air School used for training in World War II from 11 November 1940 to 20 August 1945. Known as RAF Oudtshoorn, it operated under the British Commonwealth Air Training Plan, flying Airspeed Oxford, Avro Anson and Fairey Battle41 aircraft. Providing Air Observer (Type B) training, it trained aircrew from all over the Commonwealth in navigation, bombing, and air gunnery. Since 1998 Test Flying Academy of South Africa (TFASA) operates here (initially founded as National Test Pilot School of South Africa - NTPS SA).

== Wine ==
Oudtshoorn is part of the Route 62 wine route. Award-winning South African Port style wines are produced in the area surrounding Oudsthoorn.

== Tourism ==
=== Tourist information ===
Oudtshoorn and De Rust are managed by Oudtshoorn & De Rust Tourism, whose tourism office is centrally situated in Voortrekker Road, next to the CP Nel Museum.

=== Tourist attractions ===
Tourist attractions in Oudtshoorn and the surrounding areas include:

- Buffelsdrift Game Lodge
- Cango Caves
- Cango Ostrich Farm
- Cango Wildlife Ranch
- Chandelier Game Lodge & Ostrich Show Farm
- Highgate Ostrich Show Farm
- Safari Ostrich Farm
- Swartberg Experience
- Wilgewandel Holiday Farm

The area is also famed for its biodiversity, as it is home to an unusually large number of species of succulent plant. Several wine producers also exist in the region.

== Notable people ==
- C. J. Langenhoven - writer, poet, and politician
- Etienne Leroux - Afrikaans author and key member of the South African Sestigers literary movement
- Skipper Badenhorst - Rugby union player
- Denovan Ekstraal - cricket player
- Errin Ewerts - cricket player
- Lucas "Kabamba" Floors - Rugby union player
- Mia le Roux - model famous for winning the Miss South Africa 2024 pageant
- Arthur Nortje - poet
- Bobbie Irvine MBE - World Champion ballroom & Latin American dancer
- Sid O'Linn - cricket player
- Max Rose - ostrich farmer and businessman
- Pauline Janet Smith - writer
- Percival Henry Frederick Sonn - lawyer and cricket administrator
- Wilma van der Bijl - Miss South Africa 1987
- Bertha le Roux - Miss Teen South Africa 2005
